The 1st Maine Cavalry Regiment was a volunteer United States cavalry unit from Maine used during the American Civil War.

Service history
The regiment was organized in Augusta, Maine, on October 31, 1861, and served for three years. The original members were detached from the regiment on September 15, 1864, when their service was up, and mustered out back in Portland on November 25. Later recruits, along with the Maine men of the 1st District of Columbia Cavalry (men recruited in the Augusta, Maine area between January and March 1864 and consolidated into seven companies) and those who chose to reenlist, were retained in the regiment. The regiment was split into three battalions of four companies each. One battalion was made up of former 1st District men and the other two were a mix of 1st Maine veterans and DC men. These three battalions continued until the regiment's mustering out at Petersburg, Virginia, on August 1, 1865.

Initial organization in 1861
Maine had responded to Lincoln and Congress's April 25, 1861, call for ten regiments of infantry of which eight had been organized and left the state by the end of August. That month the federal government had put out a call to Maine for five more regiments of infantry, six batteries of light artillery, a company of sharpshooters, and a regiment of cavalry to serve three years.

This cavalry regiment was intentionally raised at large from all counties of Maine and organized into twelve companies. The regiment's staff consisted of a colonel (COL), lieutenant colonel (LTC), three majors (MAJ), a first (1LT) or second lieutenant (2LT) as adjutant (1LT), surgeon, assistant surgeon, chaplain, regimental quartermaster, regimental commissary of subsistence, and three first (1LT) or second lieutenants (2LT) serving as battalion quartermasters. The regiment rated a sergeant major (SMAJ), a sergeant (SGT) as a chief bugler, a veterinary surgeon, a regimental quartermaster sergeant (QMSGT), regimental commissary sergeant (CSGT), hospital steward, saddler sergeant, sergeant farrier, and an ordnance sergeant. A captain (CAPT) commanded each company in the 1st Maine with a first lieutenant and a second lieutenant commanding the two platoons. The company commander also had the aid of a company first sergeant (1SGT) a company quartermaster sergeant, a company commissary sergeant, a farrier, and a sergeant (SGT) acting as the company commander's orderly. Each lieutenant in the platoon had two sergeants, four corporals (CPL), a bugler, and 39 privates (PVT). This gave each company a paper strength of 100 men.

The regiment had high standards for its recruits and the quality of its mounts. Recruiters were to enlist "none but sound, able-bodied men in all respects, between the ages of eighteen and thirty-five years of correct morals and temperate habits, active, intelligent, vigorous, and hardy, weighing not less than one hundred and twenty-five or more than one hundred and sixty pounds" While the average United States Infantryman was 26 and 5′ 8.25″ tall and 155 pounds, the average United States Cavalryman was the same age but slightly shorter at 5′ 7″ and lighter at 145 pounds). It encamped at Augusta at the State Fairground, renamed Camp Penobscot, where recruits initially learned military discipline and drill. Horses would arrive in December.

The 1st Maine Volunteer Cavalry Regiment mustered into federal service at Augusta on November 5, 1861, as a three-year volunteer cavalry regiment. It was commanded by COL John Goddard from Cape Elizabeth. A Regular Army cavalry officer, LTC Thomas Hight, was the second-in-command. Another regular, CAPT Benjamin F Tucker served as the Adjutant with the rest of the field and staff officers and non-commissioned officers (NCOs) being Maine men. In the companies, apart from the Company H commander, CAPT George J. Summat and the 1st Lieutenant in Company L, 1LT Constantine Taylor, all the company officers and NCOs were Maine volunteers.

The 1st Maine had an advantage in recruiting over the infantry and artillery. Many recruits found the idea of riding rather than walking incredibly attractive. Also, the cavalry had an air of glamor and romance that the other branches did not have:
 There hung about the cavalry service a dash and an excitement which attracted those men who had read and remembered the glorious achievements of 'Light Horse Harry' and his brigade, and of 'Morgan's Men' in the revolutionary war, or who had devoured the story of 'Charles O'Malley,' and similar works. In short, men who had read much in history or in fiction, preferred the cavalry service.

It is unclear whether the 1st Maine received either the 1854 cavalry shell jacket or 1857 sack coat or both. The army did issue all ranks the same standard sky-blue double-breasted winter overcoat with attached cape and a rubberized poncho for rainwear. They also received the special sky-blue wool cavalry trousers with the reinforcing double layer in the seat and inside leg due to the expected extended time in the saddle.

Training, deployment, and operations in 1862

There were prejudices against the cavalry in the War Department as it was originally thought it would not be of much use during the expected short period of conflict. MGEN George McClellan felt that it took a minimum of two years to professionally train volunteer cavalry and that they would have nothing to do but be couriers and pickets. There was also the added factor that the cost to equip and mount a Union cavalry regiment in 1861 was between $500,000 and $600,000, or roughly twice that of an infantry regiment. Some of the leadership in the command understood the lack of faith:
 The men of the south were born horsemen, almost. Old and young were nearly or quite as much at home on horseback as on foot, and the horses, also, were used to the saddle. Therefore, they could put cavalry regiments into the field with great facility and in comparatively good fighting condition, as witness the famous Black Horse Cavalry. In the northern and eastern states, it was different. Equestrianism was almost one of the lost arts. Few, especially in cities, were accustomed to riding, and the great majority of men who would enlist in the cavalry must learn to ride and to use arms on horseback, as well as learn drill, discipline, camp duties, and the duties of service generally. "A sailor on horseback," is a synonym for all that is awkward, but the veriest Jack tar on horseback was no more awkward than was a large proportion of the men who entered the cavalry service in the north and east.

While the federal government figured out where to send the regiment, they continued training at the camp living in army issue camp tents through a cold winter. The recruits were soon finding the reality of cavalry life to be quite different from their preconceived notions. The command stressed the importance of caring for their mounts and had a stable built before the first horses arrived. The necessary caring for their means of mobility, their mounts, made the men's days busier and longer than the infantryman's. During the cold, in which the regiment lost 200 men to disease and injuries, the men noted that their horses "had quarters that winter more comfortable than did the men, in comparison with the usual accommodations for man and beast."

When Edwin Stanton replaced the disgraced Simon Cameron as Secretary of War, the 1st Maine narrowly avoided disbandment before they even saw service. They were saved by the intervention of an officer who was impressed by their enthusiasm and rapid learning. As training continued, the men and horses gradually meshed into a cohesive unit overcoming the fact that many horses had no prior experience with being ridden and some of the men had no prior experience riding.

COL Goddard resigned his commission on March 1, 1862, and in response, MAJ Samuel H. Allen was commissioned Colonel by the governor and took command. To replace him, CAPT Warren L. Whitney of Company A was promoted to Major. In turn, 1LT Sidney W. Thaxter was made Captain and new Company A commander. Due to being passed over in favor of Allen, LTC Hight resigned and returned to command his company, in the 4th U.S. Cavalry. At that time, the regiment was organized into three battalions: 1st Battalion (under MAJ Warren L. Whitney with companies A, D, E and F), 2nd Battalion (under MAJ Calvin S. Douty with companies B, I, H and M), and 3rd Battalion (under MAJ David P. Stowell with companies C, G, K and L).

Still without weapons, the 1st Maine's training was drawn from the experience and training of the regular army personnel assigned to the regiment and concentrated on getting the men and their horses to work efficiently as a team in the various formations called for by cavalry regulations. The officers and non-commissioned officers (NCOs) read and studied their copies of two manuals, McClellan's Regulations and Instructions for the Field Service of the United States Cavalry in Time of War and Cooke's, Cavalry Tactics, or, Regulations for the instruction, formations, and movements of the cavalry of the army and volunteers of the United States (both published in 1861 at the start of the conflict). Through these manuals and the guidance of the regulars, the Maine troopers learned the various formations for travel and combat, the basics of setting up pickets and vedettes, and the various bugle calls to command and coordinate all these activities.

Dismounted drill was of secondary importance, but it was not forgotten. The lack of sabers was part of the shortage that plagued the U.S. volunteer cavalry organizations during the first year of the war led to "some ludicrous improvisations." The 1st Maine's solution was to buy wooden laths:
 Some time during the winter laths were procured, for the purpose of learning and practicing the sabre exercise. These were made into swords of the most grotesque shape by the men, and the exercise was looked upon very generally as a farce, was 1aughed at by outsiders, and was discontinued after a very short time; yet there is no doubt that the rudiments of the use of the sabre learned with the aid of those wooden swords was never forgotten, and proved to be of advantage when the real sabre was put into the hands of the· men. No arms were furnished, except a few old muskets for use on guard duty, till the regiment arrived at Washington.

Departure for Washington and the front

Finally, in March the regiment was ordered to the front in Virginia. 1st Battalion left for Washington on Friday, March 14, 1862, under command of COL Allen, arriving on Wednesday, the 19th without COL Allen who had fallen sick and was hospitalized in New York City. Delayed by a late winter snowstorm, 2nd Battalion departed Augusta on Thursday, March 20, under MAJ. Douty, arriving on Monday, the 24th. On that day, 3rd Battalion under MAJ Stowell left and pulled into DC on the 28th.The battalions all entrained in box cars in Augusta, eight horses and men per box car, and rode to New York city via Portland, Boston, and Providence. After a ferry across the Hudson, the detachments had a more comfortable transit to Washington with the horses in the box cars, but the men in passenger cars.

As each company in the regiment detrained and reported at the Washington Depot or New Jersey Avenue Station, each trooper received his official government arms issue of a Model 1860 Light Cavalry Saber and a pair of Colt Model 1860 revolver. The regiment also received an issue of ten breech-loaded Sharps Carbines per company, however, by now, a number of the regiment's men had privately purchased breech-loaded Sharps, Burnsides, Smith, and Merrill carbines in Maine before departure or from one of the merchants along the rail route, to give themselves a weapon with a greater range. This meant that the 1st Maine had a slightly higher proportion of carbines than the average U.S. Volunteer cavalry regiment. In Washington, the regiment pitched their tents with other reinforcements on Capitol Hill on the 29th. In camp, the regiment immediately began grinding and sharpening their newly issued blades.

On Sunday, March 30, the regiment received orders to send five companies to Harper's Ferry and join the Federal troops providing security for the Baltimore & Ohio's link between Washington and the Ohio Valley. On that day, the line had reopened, and the War Department wanted to guard it against rebel raids. MAJ Douty took five companies with the largest number of carbines and organized them into a new 1st Battalion. The remainder of the regiment would stay in Washington awaiting the return of COL Allen. The regiment, "five months after its organization, was at Washington, armed and equipped, and a portion of it under marching orders."

The 1st Battalion, comprising companies A, B, E, H, and M, loaded on box cars Monday, March 31 for Harper's Ferry, by way of Frederick and joined the " Railroad Brigade" commanded by COL Dixon Stansbury Miles, which guarded the important logistical route. The battalion's companies were separated and assigned to duty at different points along the railroad.

The remainder of the regiment remained in Washington DC. They spent the days after the 1st Battalion's departure honing their sabers and "in drill, mounted and dismounted, and in the manual of arms, and in generally preparing for active service."

The Shenandoah, the "Middletown Disaster," and First Winchester

To win the war, the United States needed to defeat the Confederate armies in the field. To win the war, the rebels had to break the will of the Federals to fight. The Shenandoah Valley, between the Blue Ridge Mountains and the Appalachians, figured in both of those war aims and ergo its control was strategically important. Known as the breadbasket of the Confederacy, the Shenandoah Valley provided a route for rebel attacks into Maryland, Washington, and Pennsylvania, thereby cutting the link between Washington and the midwest — directly attacking the United States' will to fight. The valley "was rich in grain, cattle, sheep, hogs, and fruit and was in such a prosperous condition that the Rebel army could march itself down and up it, billeting on the inhabitants." which meant that Yankee control of the valley would weaken the rebel armies helping to defeat them. Because of its strategic importance it was the scene of three major campaigns. The valley, especially in the lower northern section, was also the scene of bitter partisan fighting as the region's inhabitants were deeply divided over loyalties, and Confederate partisan John Mosby and his Rangers frequently operated in the area. Due its strategic importance, the valley saw an ebb and flow between the contesting armies until the last autumn of the war.

Transport of goods from the valley to the east was done via a network of macadamized pikes/turnpikes and rail between the larger towns supported by numerous smaller dirt roads and canals knitting them further. Much of this system had been put in place by Virginia Board of Public Works (VBPW) under the guidance of Claudius Crozet. The main north–south road transportation was the Valley Turnpike, a public-private venture through the VBPW running  from Martinsburg up through Winchester, Harrisonburg, and ending at Staunton. There were several other macadamized roads running between the larger towns and railroads. Three rail lines were the main east–west routes with B&O in the lower valley, Manassas Gap in the middle/upper, and the Virginia Central in the upper, southern end all connecting to the Valley Pike. The B&O met it at Martinsburg, the Manassas Gap met it at Strasburg after passing through the Blue Ridge Mountains at Manassas Gap at Front Royal, and the Virginia Central met it at Staunton after comin through the mountains in Crozet's Blue Ridge Tunnel.

Rebels under Jackson had severed the B&O at the northern end of the lower Shenandoah Valley during the late spring and summer of the prior year. Repeated raids and operations by Jackson's cavalry subordinate Turner Ashby and his the 7th Virginia Cavalry ("Ashby's Brigade") damaged so much railway infrastructure that it took over ten months to reopen the line on March 30, 1862. The paved roads were a great asset to the rebels in the valley being unaffected by inclement weather. An official report described Martinsburg as "on the Baltimore and Ohio Railroad, at the northern terminus of the Valley Pike—a broad macadamized road, running up the valley, through Winchester, and terminating at Staunton." Besides being a node between road and rail, Martinsburg was also home to the large, important B&O maintenance shop and roundhouse.

For the United States, the Maine men in the five companies were vital to keeping the B&O open. The battalion (and the rest of the regiment that remained in D.C.) would have an eventful Spring in 1862 marked by participation in operations against Jackson in the Shenandoah Campaign.

The Railroad Brigade

MAJ Douty and his five companies arrived in Harper's Ferry and were immediately posted to key facilities along the line. CAPT George M. Brown's Company M remained in Harper's Ferry. The rest were loaded aboard the B&O and sent to their posts. MAJ Douty and CAPT Sidney W. Thaxter's Company A were the first stop and offloaded at the B&O maintenance shop in Martinsburg. CAPT Black Hawk Putnam's Company E was the next to detrain at Back Creek where the B&O crossed it before flowing past Allensville and emptying into the Potomac. Company H commanded by CAPT George J. Summat was dropped off along the rail line opposite Hancock, MD. CAPT Jonathan B. Cilley and Company B was furthest west and last off at the Berkely Springs resort.

As well as scouting and patrolling along the rail beds, the companies patrolled out from their bases along several of the macadamized pikes. In this period along the important artery, the men of the 1st Battalion learned their craft well gaining valuable experience in the saddle. There were a handful of skirmishes, and the men of the 1st Maine captured some rebel prisoners during this period, successfully defending the line and keeping it open. On April 14, MAJ Douty received a promotion to Lieutenant Colonel of the regiment. During their time on this duty, the men of this battalion began to learn what a valuable source the local black population, enslaved and free, was for intelligence as well as who and where the local Unionists were. Of note the men in Company A were greatly pleased to be in Martinsburg where the overwhelming majority of Unionists caused the rebels to call it "Little Massachusetts".

Joining Banks

Throughout April and May, Banks and his Department of the Shenandoah had been receiving direct tasking from Secretary of War Stanton on coordinating with MGEN John C. Fremont's Mountain Department and MGEN McDowell's Department of the Rappahannock. This had led to stripping of assets from Banks and changing orders between joining with one of the other departments. As April rolled into May, Banks continued to receive frequent directives daily from the War Department over the telegraph. This revolution in communications hindered Banks in that it kept him on a tether of sorts inhibiting his freedom of action.

On Friday, May 9, 1862, the 1st Battalion came together from the various company posts to Martinsburg and went up the valley (south) to join MGEN Nathaniel P. Banks' forces at Strasburg. They joined BGEN John P. Hatch's cavalry brigade.  By May 13, the men of the 1st Maine found that Banks had divided his force to an extent that he only had 6,500 men with him astride the Valley Pike in Strasburg and 2,500 in Front Royal, fifteen miles east-southeast on the east side of the valley. On that day, BGEN Shields had departed from Front Royal on the Manassas Gap Railroad to go east and join McDowell's department. The small garrison (COL John Kenly, his Union 1st Maryland Infantry, and Companies B and D of 5th New York Cavalry) at the Front Royal station was to prevent rebel movement along the Manassas Gap rail line. Hatch's brigade covered the approaches to Strasburg with Hatch encamped at Middletown. On May 20, Douty was promoted to Lieutenant Colonel.

At the point in the valley where Banks had advanced, the Manassas Gap rail met another macadamized road, Winchester-Front Royal Pike, that ran eighteen miles along the eastern side of the valley and met Valley Pike at Winchester, 25 miles southwest of Harper's Ferry. Valley Pike passed seven miles over Cedar Creek down to Middletown, three miles further to Newtown (present day Stephens City), and finally seven miles into Winchester where it met the Winchester-Front Royal road. Several dirt roads ran between these to paved roads on either side of the valley. The men of LTCOL Douty's battalion go to know the lay of the land during their patrols in the upper Shenandoah Valley in the next couple of weeks. They learned who the Unionists were and where the back roads went.

Soon, Banks started getting intelligence from the local Unionists and black population that MGEN Thomas J. "Stonewall" Jackson's corps of 17,000 men, fresh from whipping MGEN John C. Frémont's at McDowell was heading his way. Banks had been stripped of men and artillery so that his force of 23,000 at the beginning of May to 9,000 by the 21st. Since Jackson was now positioned to block him from joining with Fremont, Banks began wondering if his now reduced force around Strasburg and Front Royal, fifteen miles east-southeast on the east side of the valley, would be able to resist any contact with Jackson. On May 23, Banks received reports of Jackson attacking the garrison at Front Royal before the telegraph link was severed. He fired off telegrams to Stanton keeping the Secretary updated on intelligence on the Front Royal attack until early morning when he decided his outnumbered force's best option was to begin withdrawing to Winchester taking the Valley Turnpike so that he could take as much of his supply train with him. By 03:00, on May 24 the twelve-mile-long column of Banks' wagons began to roll north down the Valley Turnpike to Winchester.

Jackson advances

By 07:00 on May 24, 1862, a Saturday, MGEN Banks at Strasburg wired Secretary Stanton when he confirmed that Jackson's 17,000 had completely routed the garrison at Front Royal "with considerable loss in killed, wounded, and prisoners." and were closing on him, turning his position. Under these circumstances, Banks figured that if he could reach Winchester, he would preserve his lines of communication and increase the odds of reinforcement before contact. At dawn, Banks called Hatch forward from Middletown and had him push patrols to Woodstock and along Manassas Gap Railroad. He also tasked Hatch to round up any stragglers and put to torch any supplies of military value that could not be carried off. He then began his retreat north along the Valley Pike. Doughty's battalion and two companies of the 1st Vermont under MAJ William D. Collins, just returned from patrol toward Woodstock at 02:00, (all told, a force of around 400 men) had temporarily camped at  historic Belle Grove plantation Banks pulled them onto the road at 07:00 as a rear guard escort up the road to Middletown. Banks was anxious and wanted to know where the rebels were. He sent two companies of the 29th Pennsylvania Infantry and elements of the 1st Michigan Cavalry to head east on Chapel Road, a country lane which connected Middletown, four miles north, with Cedarville (modern North Front Royal) the site of Kenly's surrender, in turn, four miles north of Front Royal.

The 1st Battalion and the two companies took up position in the rear guard of the column as Banks' column set out on the road to Winchester. As the column passed through Middletown, Banks still had not heard from the 29th Pennsylvania and 1st Michigan. In "one of the smartest moves he made all day," Banks erred on the side of caution, sent messengers to LTC Douty, then waiting for the rear of the column at Toms Brook, to come up to headquarters with his command. The five companies of the 1st Battalion under LTC Douty and the squadron of the 1st Vermont were sent north to Newtown to turn east down Chapel Road until they met, identified, and observed any Rebels. The 1st Battalion's duties were the normal cavalry tasks "to ascertain if the enemy was in force in that vicinity, to gain all possible information of his movements, and report often. If [they] met the enemy advancing [they were] told to hold him in check if possible." Feeling a bit more secure, at 09:00, Banks ordered the 500-wagon train to begin the 20-mile trek to Winchester.

Unknown to the 1st Battalion, they were about to meet Jackson's plan to trap Banks between Strasburg and Newtown on the Valley Turnpike. Jackson and Richard S. Ewell had spent the night at Cedarville and were up before dawn with his army ready to move. Still ignorant of Banks' precise location, Jackson had Ewell out on the Front Royal-Winchester Turnpike by 06:00. Jackson sent BGEN George Hume Steuart, in command of the 2nd and 6th Virginia Cavalry, ahead of the infantry to three miles north of Nineveh and cut west, off the roads and cross country to Newtown on the Valley Pike between Middletown and Winchester "to observe the movements of the enemy at that point." At the same time, he directed COL Turner Ashby and his 7th Virginia to send two companies east along the rail line from Front Royal to watch his rear, and three companies west along the rail line to scout the Federals in Strasburg. The remainder of the 7th would scout to the west of the Font Royal-Winchester pike and screen Jackson's infantry.

Initial contact

Stuart's force reached Newtown and found the road crowded with the lead portion of Banks' wagon train. Steuart charged the United States forces, captured prisoners, spread panic. While his troopers scattered the teamsters (which included many formerly enslaved local black resident who had good reason to avoid recapture, they did not burn the wagons which would have trapped the rest of Banks' train. They advanced south along the pike and met the main body of Banks' army a mile south of Newtown where they were driven off by infantry. Steuart reported his contact back to Jackson.

During the breakfast halt at Nineveh, Trimble drew Jackson's attention to a column of smoke coming from the direction of Strasburg. Receiving Steuart's report and opting to intercept Banks at Middletown, Jackson retraced his route to Cedarville. Ewell's division with the 1st Maryland Infantry, and supporting artillery, were to advance from Cedarville up Front Royal Pike to turn at Nineveh and be ready for Jackson's order to advance on Newton and meet Steuart. Meanwhile, COL Turner Ashby and BGEN Richard Taylor with his and BGEN Isaac Trimble's brigades were to advance west to Middletown on the dirt Chapel Road, made muddy by a morning rain shower, with his men from the 7th Virginia and probe across the fields toward Strasburg, followed by the rest of the army. The slogging through the mud was laborious and none of the Confederate columns knew what to expect to their front. This force would be coming right at the Maine and Vermont cavalry troopers.

Two miles short of the Front Royal Pike (three-quarters of a mile short of Molly Camel Run), at 09:00, Ashby's scouts had observed an earlier patrol of the 29th Pennsylvania Infantry and 1st Michigan Cavalry who had not seen them. This force had only advanced three mile toward Cedarville when they received a few carbine shots from Ashby's men. Instead of ascertaining who they had met, they retreated hastily to Middletown.  A local Unionist who was on Banks' staff, David Hunter Strother, later wrote that they had failed through timidity and incompetence thereby blinding Banks to his true situation.

Ashby's scouts likewise failed in their mission to report the contact back to Jackson and moved scross the fields to the west along Molly Camel Run toward the a column of smoke at Strasburg and failed to scout further up the road to Middletown. Since he was still ignorant of what lay ahead on the Chapel Road, Jackson had sent his cartographer, MAJ Jedediah Hotchkiss with a small cavalry squad scouting further up Chapel Road toward Middletown while sending word for Ashby to turn his aim from Stasburg to Newtown. Hotchkiss was under instruction to send reports back every half hour. He had only moved one and a half miles and was beginning an ascent up a rise Chapel Road just beyond Molly Camel Run when Douty's videttes posted along the road saw Hotchkiss's party coming along the muddy track.  While remaining unobserved, the videttes sent a rider back to warn Douty of an approaching scouting party. Douty moved forward and threw out skirmishers to right and left of the road and sent the men armed with carbines ahead as skirmishers into the woods along the road. He sent riders back to the signal officer in Middletown for relay to Hatch and Banks. He then waited as the enemy closed range with his men.

As Hotchkiss and his men came into range of pistols and carbines, the Maine and Vermont troopers drove them back with heavy fire, and the Confederates retreated out of sight. Douty consulted with Collins and both realized that the woods would prevent them from seeing any flanking movements by the rebels from their position. at 11:00, having seen no more sign of the rebels, Douty called in his skirmish line and left out vedettes in the road and in the fields to keep watch. At the advice of MAJ Collins, he pulled the rest of his small command two miles back toward Middletown to Providence Church (present-day Reliance United Methodist Church) where they were able to see the fields for miles on either side of the road.

Hotchkiss had sent a rider back to report contact to Jackson who again, sent word to Ashby to change direction from Strasburg to Chapel Road.

At 12:00, the vedettes came up the road and rejoined with word that Rebel cavalry and infantry were following them. Within fifteen minutes, Hotchkiss, and his party with two companies of the 8th Louisiana Infantry appeared, halted, and kept out of carbine range. In the ensuing half-hour, the rebels brought up artillery and unlimbered them in the road.

Around 12:45, the rebel artillery opened on Douty and his men and the infantry and dismounted cavalry advanced. Holding fire until the regrouped, reinforced rebels came into range, Douty's men kept up a heavy fire that threw back the enemy, particularly the 21st North Carolina Infantry from Taylor's Brigade. This led Hotchkiss to believe he was facing a much larger force of infantry in the woods as well as Douty's cavalry astride the road. This managed to buy Banks more time as Jackson sent word to Ewell's Division to halt until he knew against whom he was fighting.

In response, rebel artillery continued firing on the 1st Maine and the now empty woods. This led Douty to bring in his skirmishers and make fighting withdrawal. "stubbornly for every inch of ground" back to Middletown. As they withdrew, the rebels pushed forward. He executed a steady and deliberate withdrawal the four miles back along Chapel Road to Middletown, causing enough uncertainty in Jackson's mind that it delayed the advance by nearly two hours. Under the pressure of the advance, Douty got his command back to Middleton with the loss of a horse. At 14:30 Douty turned off the Chapel Road and onto Church Street a block east of Valley Turnpike. The signal officer on duty told him that Banks had already through and BGEN Hatch was expected at any moment. Douty led his men into the village of Middletown, south of the crossroads, to wait for Hatch.

The 8th Louisiana now appeared north of town and the accompanying guns of Chew's Battery from Steuart's Brigade began shelling Douty's and Collins' men. Douty was about to call for a withdrawal back to Strasburg when Hatch arrived around 15:30. He deployed Douty and Collins into the side streets and fields east of the turnpike, and waited for 5th New York and the remainder of the 1st Vermont to catch up from burning the last of the stores at Strasburg.

At the same time, Ashby's men appeared on the high ground on their flank to the southeast of town. Despite the macadam, travel along the shoulders had thrown up a great cloud of dust all along the pike. Within minutes, 8th Louisiana Infantry had moved down from the high ground, cut the pike, and began plundering the wagon train while Chew's artillery began firing on wagons further north. Hatch kept Douty's command in a skirmish line to the east between Jackson's Corps and the town. The 1st Battalion and the Vermonters kept the 1st Virginia and 21st North Carolina Infantry at bay.

At 16:00, Hatch realized his command was surrounded when messengers sent to contact Banks' retreating wagon train returned with news that the Valley Pike was blocked by wagons and manned by rebels. Hatch said to LTC Douty, "We must cut our way through." This was the seed of the 1st Maine's "Middletown Disaster".

"The Disaster" 

Hatch had the 1st Maryland Cavalry and 5th New York Cavalry with him as well as Douty's small command. COL Charles H Tompkins and the remaining ten companies of the 1st Vermont Cavalry and future Medal of Honor winner Charles H. T. Collis and his independent company of Pennsylvania Zouaves d'Afrique (manning wagons) were still en route from Strasburg. He sent riders back to warn Tompkins and Collis to skirt to the west of Middletown and take back roads to Winchester since the rebels held the Valley Turnpike.

As rebel artillery continued to sporadically fire shells into downtown Middletown, Hatch formed up his brigade along the turnpike by the town square in columns of fours. The 1st Battalion and the 1st Vermont fell in at the rear of the brigade's column at the southern edge of Middletown. Taking the lead, Hatch moved out on the turnpike. Already receiving sporadic rifle fire before going very far, Hatch took the column off the pike onto a dirt road a half-mile out of town.

Upon contact with the enemy on this road, Hatch charged and the whole column galloped down the road shooting and slashing at any rebels in their path. This generated a cloud of dust that obscured the turn off the Valley Turnpike. At the head of the column as the charge continued, Hatch saw that Ashby had managed to get one of his batteries behind a wagon barricade back on the turnpike and supported it with elements of the 21st North Carolina. Seeing more rebels moving off the pike and cutting a dirt lane parallel to the pike by several hundred yards, Hatch continued west on his path and smashed through the handful of Ashby's cavalry on that road, bypassing the artillery.

Looking back over the fields, the column could see the two companies of the 1st Vermont followed by the Maine battalion continuing in a charge down the Valley Turnpike. Unfortunately for the 1st Battalion, the huge cloud of dust had obscured the column departing the macadam from MAJ Collins. The rebels had seen them, as well, and a quick-thinking officer on Jackson's staff, LT Douglas quickly rushed a company of infantry to a stonewall in a blocking position over the Turnpike. LTC Douty had been at the rear seeing to a severely wounded CAPT Cilley of Company B when he noticed the Vermont companies moving out at the trot. When MAJ Collins and two 1st Vermont companies missed the turn and came out of the dust cloud, they saw a rebel battery supported by an infantry blocking the Valley Turnpike. With the stone walls alongside the road leaving no other option, at point-blank range, they charged:
 Moving at a rapid rate in sections of four, in a cloud of dust, supposing they wore following their Gen­eral, coming suddenly upon this battery in a narrow road where it was impossible to man­euver, a terrible scene of confusion followed. Those at the head of the column wore suddenly stopped, those in the roar unable to restrain their horses rushed upon each other, and men and horses were thrown in a confused heap. And as they wore all the while exposed to the shot, and shell, and bayonets, of the enemy, it is not strange that their loss was severe, number­ing one hundred and seventy men with an equal number of horses. At the same time compan­ies A and B at a little distance were under a severe fire, during which [Captain] Putnam, and Lieutenant Estes were wounded. Escaping from this perilous position, Lieut. Colonel Douty fell back on the pike, and taking an intersecting road and making a detour to the left. After a hard march rejoined the main column at Newtown [sic, actually Winchester] the next day, and was immediately ordered to support a battery.

As the column had moved out, Douty had mounted his horse and rode toward the head of the Vermont companies to join Collins. Before passing the last company, the column had already broken into a gallop and "was charging up the pike amid a shower of shell and bullets." He found the dust so thick that he could see nothing but what was close by him. He began seeing men and horses strewn on the wayside. By the time he reached the third company from the end, Company M, the bodies of horses and men, alive and dead, were contained so tightly that they could not continue, and men started retreating. The battalion spilled over the stonewalls and into the surrounding fields cutting their way through the rebels. Many Maine men were unhorsed by the collision with those ahead of them as well as by rebel artillery and musketry. Many these were taken prisoner by Wheat's "Louisiana Tigers" in Taylor's Brigade. Many took off on foot to try to escape. Luckily for those who were able to put some distance between themselves and the enemy, the presence of abandoned wagons from Banks' train loaded with supplies provided a welcome distraction as more and more of Trimble's and Taylor's left the firing line to men rifle through it. This gave Douty and his men the chance escape. The woods surrounding the fields were noticeably absent of any underbrush that could hide the escaping troopers as they darted between the trunks of the oak trees. While Ashby's cavalry were able to capture some mor of the dismounted men, the Maine horseman found that by using pistols and sabers in small groups, they were able to fend off their pursuers who eventually ceased pursuit to join the infantry in the plundering the abandoned wagons.

Douty gathered what men he could and pulled back into Middletown. He reformed his command in the center of town. A company of Ewell's infantry formed up at the southern end of town and opened fire on the New England cavalrymen. LTCOL Douty pulled his men back out of their range and turned left down the side-streets and rode west out of Middletown out of sight of the rebels. Eventually, he turned his group north the Middle Road and found Hatch and the brigade after a two-mile gallop.

Battle of First Winchester

The rest of Hatch's brigade who had seen the debacle across the fields had continued parallel to the Valley Turnpike but found that every time they tried to regain the pike and join Banks, their way was blocked by Ewell's troops. They ended up cutting through Ashby's cavalry and rejoined Banks at Newtown. There Hatch found Col George Henry Gordon and his brigade with five companies of the 1st Michigan Cavalry giving ground slowly. Hatch's men joined in the rear-guard action making Winchester at 22:00, Saturday evening.

At dawn on Sunday, May 25, BGEN Charles Winder's Stonewall Brigade occupied the hill due south of the town. As Winder attacked down toward Winchester, Banks' artillery soon found their range and began an effective, punishing fire. The 1st Battalion was ordered to provide support for one of these batteries. The Stonewall Brigade stalled in their attack. Jackson ordered Taylor's Brigade to outflank the Union right which they did with a strong charge pushing the right flank back into town. At the same time, Ewell's men got around the extreme left of the Union line. With the impending double envelopment, around 07:00, Banks' line pulled back through the streets of town. The 1st Battalion covered the battery as they limbered up and headed north on the Valley Pike.

As the U.S. troops pulled out of the town, the Maine troopers noted that the local secessionist civilians were jeering them, throwing boiling water, and even shooting at them. Along with the rest of Hatch's brigade, they found themselves fighting their way out of the town under attack from all sides. The vehemence of the local secssionists and Jackson's force climaxed in reports several instances of no quarter being given to some of Banks' wounded who had fallen out of the retreat.

Instead of a wild flight, Jackson later wrote that Banks's troops "preserved their organization remarkably well" through the town. Elated, Jackson rode cheering after the retreating enemy shouting "Go back and tell the whole army to press forward to the Potomac!" Luckily for the 1st Battalion in the rearguard, the Confederate pursuit was ineffective. Ashby and the rest of the rebel cavalrymen had conducted vigorous pursuits of U.S. forces to the south and east. By the time they rejoined Jackson, their horses were blown and men too exhausted to effectively chase down Banks' rearguard leading Jackson to write, "Never was there such a chance for cavalry. Oh that my cavalry was in place!"

As Hatch's brigade swept back and forth at the rear to keep the occasional pursuer at arm's length the outnumbered Federals fled relatively unimpeded for 35 miles in 14 hours, crossing the Potomac River into Williamsport, Maryland after dark around 21:00, Sunday evening. Hatch noted the fine performance of the 1st Maine Cavalry in his post action reports. Among the units in Banks' retreating force for whom the 1st Maine provided a sense of security were their fellow Mainer, the 10th Maine. Union casualties were 2,019 (62 killed, 243 wounded, and 1,714 missing or captured), Confederate losses were 400 (68 killed, 329 wounded, and 3 missing).

Aftermath
First Winchester had proven costly to the 1st Maine. Several the companies in the 1st Battalion suffered more than half their number as prisoners after the mess in the road with the rebel battery. Company A suffered the most, arriving at Winchester with eighteen men. During this action, the battalion lost three killed, one mortally wounded, nine wounded, twelve wounded and taken prisoner, one mortally wounded and taken prisoner, forty-nine taken prisoner of whom five would die in rebel captivity, and 176 horses and equipment.

Over the next three weeks, many men who had eluded capture or had escaped captivity straggled in to rejoin the regiment. On Tuesday, forty odd men arrived with COL DeForest of the 5th New York Cavalry with thirty-two wagons of supplies that they had managed to spirit away from Confederate hands at Middletown, having been forced by rebel pursuers to cut through the mountains and ford the Potomac upriver by Clear Spring. Some stragglers arrived on foot having lost their mounts in the fighting. A group of twenty had been held in Winchester when they encountered MAJ Whitney and his small command en route to MGEN Banks on June 3. Additionally, thirty or more of the men being transported south on the Valley Turnpike to captivity in Richmond managed to escape the night of the May 24 and make their way back to the 1st Maine in Maryland. A group of fourteen troopers from Companies A and L managed to report back in to the regiment at Westport on May 27 after escaping through the mountains via Pughtown and Bath. Several members of the command made their way to Harper's Ferry and thence to the regiment at Williamsport.

All the while, starting with the first letters home, there was much confusion regarding the dead, wounded, and missing. CAPT Cilley was mistakenly reported dead in several letters. This confusion was unfortunately common during the war.

In Williamsport, while Douty worked diligently remounting his command, the news of Banks's ouster from the Valley caused a stir in Washington lest Jackson continue north and threaten the capital. Lincoln, who in the absence of a general in chief was exercising day to day strategic control over his armies in the field, took aggressive action in response. He planned trap on Jackson using three armies. Frémont's would move to Harrisonburg on Jackson's supply line, Banks would move back in the Valley, and 20,000 men under McDowell would move to Front Royal and attack Jackson driving him against Frémont at Harrisonburg.

Unfortunately, this plan was complex and required synchronized movements by separate commands. Banks declared his army was too shaken to move. It would remain north of the Potomac until June 10. Frémont and McDowell bungled it completely. Jackson defeated the two in detail – Frémont at the Battle of Cross Keys on June 8 and McDowell at Battle of Port Republic on June 9. Of note, one of the 1st Maine's nemeses, Turner Ashby died on Chestnut Ridge near Harrisonburg in a skirmish with Frémont's cavalry.

On June 12, the 1st Battalion crossed the Potomac and returned to Winchester. Company K continued down the Valley Pike to Strasburg. Companies E and M traveled south on the also macadam Front Royal-Winchester Road to Front Royal, where they were joined on the 20th by companies A and B, and the brigade placed attached to BGEN Crawford's infantry brigade. The remainder of LTC Douty's command's time in the Shenandoah was uneventful save a brief skirmish at Milford, on July 2 (CAPT Thaxter commanding). On July 9, Douty received orders to rejoin the regiment at Warrenton.

In the Department of the Rappahannock

The main body of the regiment had remained in Washington, DC while the 1st Battalion operated in and around the Shenandoah Valley. On April 2, 1862, orders arrived for a march to Warrenton, VA on Friday, April 4. The troopers spent Thursday sharpening their sabers and checking their equipment. When their departure was delayed by a day, the regiment continued honing their edged weapons. On Friday evening, the men were given a patriotic send-off including a concert sung by ladies from Maine who were residing in Washington.

At midday Saturday, the regiment departed their encampment on Capitol Hill led by MAJ Stowell (COL Allen was still recuperating in New York). The inexperienced regiment "accompanied by a baggage train long enough for a whole corps later in the war," rode down Maryland Avenue SW and crossed the Potomac on Long Bridge.

Into rebel territory
On the Virginia side, it checked in at Fort Runyon. At the fort, they received orders to report to BGEN McDowell's Department of the Rappahannock's forces at Warrenton Junction (present day Calverton, Virginia) via the Columbia, Little River, and Warrenton Turnpikes. The regiment crossed the Alexandria Canal and climbed up the Columbia Turnpike passing Fort Albany on the left as they crested the rise. The regiment continued on and could see Robert E Lee's home, Arlington House on a rise to the right.  The men of the 1st Maine were taking in the sights as they traveled for the first time in rebel territory.

As Lee's home faded into the distance, the men descended a small vale to Arlington Mills Station crossing both 4 Mile Run and the Alexandria, Loudoun, and Hampshire Railroad (AL&H). The men noted heavy use of the railway as they crossed it seeing other troops and supplies at the station. A mile beyond the railway and above the dell, at 15:00, the regiment briefly stopped at Bailey's Crossroads to water their horses. They had taken three hours to travel the nine miles from the encampment on Capitol Hill to the crossroads. Once the horses were watered, the regiment mounted up and continued down Columbia Turnpike. At Padgett's Tavern, the regiment turned right on the Little River Turnpike another macadamized road. They crossed the unfinished new rail cut that would run from the Orange and Alexandria Railroad through Annandale and Fairfax to Haymarket. By sunset on Saturday, April 5, 1862, the 1st Maine had reached Fairfax Courthouse.

The men in the regiment were familiar with the history of the courthouse "where the eloquence of a Patrick Henry and a ·William ·Wirt bad exerted its magic power." While dismayed at its state of ruin, the troopers still were fascinated by the building, the grounds, and the various remnants of the county records strewn about the location. Picketing the horses in the Courthouse's yards, the troopers were crammed into the Courthouse's various buildings.

The regiment was up at dawn on Sunday morning, April 6. By 09:00, they had groomed their horses, broke fast, and were on the Little River Turnpike once more heading west. A mile down the pike, the command made a left turn in the village of Germantown and rode onto the Warrenton Turnpike heading west-southwest where Centreville, VA lay six miles away. They continued passing vacant fields on either side of the road. Ahead on a slight ridge on either side of the pike, the men saw some of the rebel "Quaker guns," manned with stuffed dummies that the rebels had placed there to give their pickets on the rise the look of a fortified position from the distance. At noon they passed them and entered Centreville. A water halt was made there for the horses, and after seeing to their mounts, the men inspected the effigies with great interest. Within an hour, the command had remounted and left Warrenton Pike and turned onto a dirt road heading south to Manassas Junction. Shortly, they found themselves crossing Bull Run over a partially rebuilt bridge which had been destroyed by the Confederates when they retreated. Although on the edge of the battlefield, the Maine men saw solitary chimneys where houses used to be. Dead rotting horses generated "that peculiar stench which afterwards became familiar to all soldiers." As the march continued, many a Maine trooper was sobered by the sight of numerous soldiers' graves on the roadside along Warrenton Turnpike. At dark the regiment was at Manassas Junction. Their horses were picketed by the side of the road and the men had their first experience (of many) in sleeping out-of-doors. The weather was fair, and morale was high, and the "boys, though tired, were in good spirits, and inclined to make the best of the circumstances. The command had marched 17 miles from Fairfax Courthouse.

Monday, April 7, 1862, was a gray, drizzly day, as the 1st Maine traveled along the dirt road that paralleled the Orange & Alexandria past Bristoe Station and Catlett's Station all the way to Warrenton Junction. They saw ripe wheat fields and fine manors, all abandoned. It started drizzling in the late morning, and after a midday water stop, the rain increased. The muddy road and numerous fords over creeks made the march a difficult one, but after twelve miles, around 15:00 they reported to McDowell's Department of the Rappahannock in Warrenton Junction. The baggage train were still on the dirt road having been held up at a ford that was too deep for their transit.

Training and patrolling

After scrounging for rations the first day in camp, the wagons finally caught up with the regiment having taught the men a valuable lesson – always have some rations and extra ammunition on their person or mount. Graced with an early spring snowstorm on Tuesday, the men made the best of camp life, drilling, and seeing to their horses.

First assigned to Gen. Abercrombie's brigade, and soon afterwards to Gen. Ord's division within McDowell's department, the 1st Maine was learning its job. The occasional patrols were the primary means for this on-the-job-training. Companies were detached singly, in twos, threes, and more to conduct these reconnaissances. Friday, April 11, they spent the night scouting Warrenton and returned Saturday morning. They made several more such patrols through the remainder of April and into May. In this time, they became adept at river-crossings, bringing the right amount of gear for a mission, and handling their horses while also learning how valuable a source of intelligence both the enslaved and free black population would be.

On Tuesday, April 15, Company C under CAPT Dyer made a patrol down the Orange & Alexandria to the Rappahannock where they saw black slaves building earthworks on the opposite side of the river north of the railroad. As they moved north, they could see a large, white plantation house which they surmised to be the rebel headquarters. Two slaves who had escaped across the river estimated that there were between 5,000 and 7,000 troops total in the area. Examination of the field works through binoculars led Dyer to believe they alone could hold 3,000–4,000 men. As they turned to report back, three rebel batteries opened fire on them. After getting out of range and sight of the rebels, they learned from some black women the identities of several locals who were visiting their camp and reporting back to the rebels.

The next evening, Wednesday, April 16, LTC Willard Sayles, commander of the 1st Rhode Island Cavalry, took a squadron of his regiment and Companies D and F of the 1st Maine on a patrol toward Liberty Church to interrogate and arrest the reported rebel informants.{{sfnp|U.S. War Dept., Official Records, Vol. 12/1|p=425|ps= -  Report of LTC Willard Sayles, 1st RI Cavalry, April 17, 1862}} After receiving accurate intelligence from the suspects' slaves, three men were arrested and turned over to the brigade headquarters.

On Tuesday, April 22, COL Allen rejoined his command. The regiment was being moved around and attached to various infantry brigades. Sometimes various companies were detached for provost or courier duties. Other than these command duties their time was spent on picket duty and scouting patrols for their various attached commands. Their constant reassignment led, by mid-May, to the common query among the men, "whose kite are we going to be tail to next?" In fact, this problem affected not only the 1st Maine but all volunteer cavalry regiments in the eastern theater. The Army of the Potomac's cavalry would not serve as a unified force until the upcoming Maryland Campaign.

 Culpeper reconnaissance

The only patrol where the regiment operated as one body was a reconnaissance patrol to Culpeper Court House on Sunday, May 4, 1862, through Monday, May 5. Under BGEN Hartsuff's direction, the 1st Maine took up their line of march Sunday, May 4, 1862, at 17:00, for reconnaissance to the Rappahannock River and beyond Culpeper Courthouse. The expedition was led by MAJ Stowell due to COL Allen's continued infirmity. and the men were tasked with bringing three days rations with them. After proceeding en miles in the darkness, Stowell halted at 20:30 and obtained a local Unionist as guide who took them two miles further to the road along the north side of the Rappahannock. The command then took this road two miles further north to Beverly's Ford. With the water up to five feet deep and a strong current, the regiment did not finish crossing until midnight.

The guide suggested that the best place for a horse and water was the Cunningham plantation, or Elkwood Plantation, Farley Hill, by Farley Road over Ruffian's Run, the late headquarters of the Confederate Army. Around 01:00, the command gained access to the main house from the overseer who provided valuable intelligence on the geography of Culpeper County and the local rebel order of battle.

At 04:00, the 1st Maine resumed their march, with the overseer guiding them. Instead of taking a dirt track (present day Farley Road) which went through a wood and low land, Stowell accepted the guide's suggestion to ride along Fleetwood Hill that gave a view of the river and railroad as well as of the surrounding country, thus precluding being surprised by the enemy. Pushing on toward Brandy Station, Stowell had thrown out a company of skirmishers and a formidable rear guard, which covered more than a mile of the country.

Stowell found the general appearance of the country favorable, gently rolling, open, highly cultivated, and fruitful, rich plantations, with an abundance of forage and subsistence. He noted the brush was much heavier than about Warrenton Junction. After crossing the river, the men had found no real road leading south and on their left until they arrived at Brandy Station. There they found remains of an old plank road, connecting the Fredericksburg and Culpeper Plank Roads with the Old Carolina and Kelly's Ford Roads.

The patrol found that the rebels on the Rappahannock had fallen back to Gordonsville, and there has been no force this side of there of any great amount. Stowell noted that the "planters on our route, as near as I could judge, are nearly all secesh [sic], and a little bleeding would reduce their fever a little and do them good."

Advancing on from Brandy Station to Culpeper Court House around 09:00, the 1st Maine found that the middle and upper classes were secessionist who could not be trusted to give accurate information, but that the blacks and poor whites were exceptionally reliable, giving corroboration, and very willing to give all the intelligence they had. Two miles beyond Brandy Station, Stowell heard that a line of pickets was established about three miles this side of Culpeper, ergo about two miles ahead of them. Further interrogation of a civilian intercepted coming from the courthouse indicated that the rebels there were two companies of cavalry all equipped with carbines.

After leaving this man by the wayside and advancing about one mile, at 10:15, Stowell received a messenger from CAPT Taylor commander of L Company, the advance guard, that LT Vaughan had found the pickets, charged them, put them to flight, and now Company L and Taylor were chasing them down the railroad. Stowell ordered the column forward as fast as possible. On arriving within a half-mile of the town, he detached men to high ground to the north and south of town to avoid surprises. He next sent two companies forward to support Taylor and Company L which had continued pursuit through the town and out the other side. The men on the high ground reported seeing horses being driven into a yard northwest of town. Stowell sent CAPT Smith forward to investigate.

Not having heard from either Taylor or Smith, Stowell kept the command spread out while he and Company C searched the courthouse and questioned the civilians. While the men in Culpeper were "sour-looking and reserved," they again found that the black people and handful of Unionists and poor whites were reliable sources. According to the friendly locals, the regiment's approach generated quite a stir, and two couriers immediately rode to the Rapidan, some eight miles beyond Culpeper, for two regiments of infantry which were stationed there. Stowell also learned that the rebels mounted the horses without regard to ownership, and very many without stopping to saddle them. The man intercepted and interrogated on the way in had proven to be accurate as per the composition of the force posted at the courthouse

Considering the short distance to the two regiments of rebel infantry (they were just a few stations up the Orange & Alexandria rail line) and not hearing from CAPT Taylor, Stowell became concerned about the regiment's quite critical situation. While searching stables and yards for horses to seize, the returned CAPT Smith and several company and platoon officers alerted him to a force of cavalry on the south side of the town. Initially thought to be rebels as the force had light-colored horses and some of it light clothing, it turned out to be CAPT Taylor. He had taken some prisoners were riding some of the light-colored horses and dressed in light clothing.

At 11:00, after finding no papers of great consequence except a handful of rifles, carbines, shotguns, and pistols, the command began its trek back to its base. Stowell remarked that by following the railroad, they could tear up the track at any time if the cars should approach us with infantry. Stopping at Jonas Run about 13:30 to water and feed their horses, and then returned to the Rappahannock by 16:30. Stowell deemed it unwise to stop on the south side for the night, lest rebel infantry catch them by railroad. Since only their cavalry could ford the river, which the Maine troopers did not fear, Stowell turned the column north along the riverbank toward Beverly's Ford as it started top rain.

Arriving about 18:30, the command began across finding the water about higher than the night before and consequently a difficult two-hour evolution. Originally intending on camping on the north side for the night, Stowell found a consensus to push on home through the stormy weather twelve miles farther.

Stowell cleared the last of his men into camp and reported to COL Allen at 23:00. While not encountering any meaningful contact, the 1st Maine had successfully scouted the furthest distance south over the Rappahannock of any United States unit thus far in the war covering 60 miles over the course of 31 hours and returning with confirmed enemy order of battle, transportation infrastructure intelligence, enemy supply/logistics status, and eight prisoners. The command was duly praised for its competence and professionalism.

 Move to Falmouth

After several successful foraging and scouting expeditions that netted a handful of prisoners, on Friday, May 9, the brigade, now commanded by BGEN Hartsuff, received orders to pack its gear and move to Falmouth, opposite Fredericksburg on the Rappahannock, twenty-five miles to the southeast. On Monday, May 12 at noon, the brigade departed Warrenton. The five companies of the 1st Maine served as advance and rear guards during the march.

At 17:00, after traveling eight miles, Companies D, K, and L, the advance guard, halted and set camp. The brigade found the travel very difficult, and the rear guard did not arrive at camp until 21:30 Monday evening.

Reveille at 04:00 got the men up to care for their horses and prepare for the day's march. Companies C, F, G, and I rotated to take the advance guard on Tuesday and were stepping out at 06:30. After all the infantry and wagons got out of the camp, D, K, and L finally got on the road at 08:30. COL Allen's command noted the number of "large plantations of rare beauty" along the march. May 13, 1862, was a hot and humid day and the heat almost insufferable, with a dense cloud of dust that made the horses in front of the troopers almost invisible. The infantry in the brigade suffered greatly as the column spun out for miles. The advance guard halted at Stafford Court House at 14:00, but the rear companies did not arrive until 18:30. The men in the brigade were impressed with the relatively untouched countryside, quite amid the spring green, as they passed through.

As the column had progressed during the day, they had attracted a large following of escaped slaves, or "contraband," who seized their freedom by joining the column. Again, these local black residents proved exceedingly valuable sources of intelligence.

The next morning, the Maine troopers rose earlier than their exhausted infantry brothers to prepare their horses for the last leg of the journey south to Falmouth. Again, the companies rotated between advance and rear guard and resumed the march with an awake and fed infantry by 07:00. Within an hour that Wednesday morning, it began raining which spared the brigade from the heat of the day before but added a wet chill to the march.

Hartsuff's brigades's advance guard of Companies D, K, and L reached Falmouth, on the opposite side of the Rappahannock from Fredericksburg, by mid afternoon. The remainder of the brigade streamed in until 20:00.The march of 30 miles through Virginia mud had been difficult. Nearly half of the infantry fallen out by the wayside at some point of the march. Despite the rigor, the 1st Maine troopers noticed several large, beautiful plantations, indicating fine taste. They also noticed again the support and value of the local black population as intelligence sources. The column had met many groups of slaves acting as agents of their own emancipation by escaping to Federal lines.

 Falmouth and the Shenandoah Valley
Through April and May of that spring, the men of the 1st Maine had followed the progress of McClellan in his Peninsula Campaign through the Northern newspaper available in camp as well as the enemy press available along the route of march. The forces at Fredericksburg were commanded by McDowell to block any advance on Washington and to tie down Confederate troops marking them across the river at Fredericksburg. While the confederates had reduced their numbers at Fredericksburg, the U.S. forces increased in number yet did not advance.

While at Falmouth, Hartsuff's brigade with Rickett's brigade now formed a division under a prior commander, Ord, Ord's division was reviewed by Gen. McDowell, and three days later, Friday, May 23, President Lincoln, accompanied by Secretary of War Stanton, M. Mercier, the French Minister, and other distinguished gentlemen, as well as by Mrs. Lincoln, Mrs. Stanton, and other ladies, reviewed McDowell's whole force. In camp at Falmouth, the regiment received new shelter tents (today known as pup tents) so that every two men would always he supplied with a tent for shelter. Despite initial misgivings, the troopers eventually found them much better tents than their original ten- and twelve man tents.

Sunday, May 25, the regiment, with the 2nd Maine Light Battery (CAPT James A. Hall), the 5th Maine Light Battery (CAPT George F. Leppien), and the 1st Pennsylvania Light Battery (CAPT Ezra W. Matthews), all under command of COL Allen, marched to Alexandria. The command was in motion at 18:00 in the evening, and after a tedious march went into bivouac on the road at 23:30, having made five miles in as many hours, owing to continuous delays caused by the artillery and wagons getting stuck in the mud. By 07:00, they were on the road to Alexandria again. At 12:00, however, a courier caught up with COL Allen with orders for them to march to Manassas Junction instead. Allen had the small command go into camp planning on an early start on Tuesday.

McDowell had received reports of the rebels in considerable force near Centreville, and he decided to consolidate his forces at Manassas. On the road by 05:00, the regiment and three batteries bivouacked on the roadside on Tuesday evening and made Manassas by midday, Wednesday, May May 28, joining the remainder of McDowell's corps, camping there that night.

On Thursday morning, Washington ordered McDowell to the Shenandoah Valley to assist Banks so the whole force, with the 1st Maine in the advance, took up the line of march for Front Royal. Washington was intent on this force cutting Jackson's force off in the lower valley between McDowell and Banks.The regiment passed through Thoroughfare Gap and camped Thursday night on the other side of the Blue Ridge Mountains. On Friday, they went fifteen miles further and camped on the estate of the late Chief Justice Marshall, and the third day, Saturday, May 31, reached Front Royal at dark in the rain camping just outside the village on the Manassas Gap Road.

 MAJ Whitney's mission

One week prior to the 1st Maine's arrival as part of Ord's Division, Saturday, May 24, Jackson's forces, after demolishing the 1st Maryland Cavalry at Front Royal, had met their brethren in the 1st Battalion with LTC Douty and driven MGEN Banks' up the other side of the valley to Winchester following up with driving Banks further out of the valley and across the Potomac into Maryland on Sunday. At Front Royal, the regiment met a handful of their comrades from the 1st Battalion who had been captured after The Disaster with MAJ Collins from the 1st Vermont. The day before, Friday May 30, the 1st Rhode Island had liberated these men when MGEN Shields' forces retook the town. Unknown to the regiment, more of their comrades were being held temporarily at several locations in the valley.

At Front Royal, McDowell, now in command, found it very important to open communication with General Banks, who had moved downriver from Williamsport to Harper's Ferry at the lower end of the valley. On Sunday, before his arrival, Shields had heard the artillery fire from Jackson's clash with Fremont at Fisher's Hill but refrained from moving to his assistance because he wanted to wait for McDowell and all of his forces to arrive. While he now knew Jackson may have slipped away at Strasburg, he also wanted to get a picture of the disposition of Confederate forces between him and Winchester, specifically if Jackson and his main body of troops were still threatening Washington. Accordingly, the next day Monday, June 2, he ordered a small force to attempt to make contact. COL Allen upon receiving the orders sent MAJ Whitney with Companies C and D to reconnoiter in that direction, and if possible, open a line of communicate with Banks. The mission was risky as the rebels now commanded the valley.

MAJ Whitney and his little command started late in the afternoon at 16:00. In moderate rain, they traveled up the macadamized Front Royal-Winchester Road, passing through Cedarville and Nineveh without seeing any enemy. The sun set at 19:30 and with the mountains' shadows, it was too dark to continue so Whitney halted his men in the woods about two miles from Winchester. They had heard from the local black population that the Confederates were holding Winchester but that Jackson's main body had already slipped into Strasburg the same day they had arrived ten miles away. This would be valuable intelligence for both Banks and McDowell as well as the fact that they had not seen any rebels troops during their journey in the rain. They remained in the woods that night in a driving rain without fires to hide their presence from the enemy. Without shelter, they were "cold, wet, and decidedly uncomfortable," but the Maine troopers knew the storm and darkness were advantageous to their dangerous mission.

At early dawn, Tuesday, the command dashed into town and through it, creating a complete surprise to the rebel force of about 300 who held the town. This force was left by Jackson to guard about 200 Union soldiers captured by Jackson's forces the week before including a handful of 1st Maine troopers, The rebels had not expected any threat between them and Jackson's main body and failed to put pickets south of the town. They were completely surprised as well as the local citizenry who remembering, "their barbarous conduct toward the retreating troops of General Banks, a few days before, they anticipated a fearful retribution." As the little force, at an hour when few in the town were stirring, swept like a whirlwind into the town, they were very naturally supposed' to be the advance of a heavy force.

The consternation and frightened looks and actions of soldiers and citizens, as well as the joyous surprise of the prisoners, amused the Maine troopers. The panic seized rebel soldiers and the civilians that beds were suddenly vacated, toilets neglected, garments forgotten or ludicrously adjusted, and rebel soldiers threw down their arms in dismay while others took safety in flight. Taking advantage of the enemy's sudden panic and disorganization, many prisoners with their wits about them took off north on the road to Harper's Ferry where friendly forces lay. A few of these men were some captured from LTCOL Douty's battalion at Middletown Several of these men obtained mounts and joined Whitney's expedition.

The whole number of Union prisoners in the town might have been liberated, but since this was not in the mission's orders, Whitney did not stop to do so. His first objective of the mission to scout between Front Royal and Winchester was accomplished. The orders being next to communicate with MGEN Banks and not stop to fight, Whitney's command pushed on. MAJ Whitney found a guide who stated that a rebel force was in camp just beyond Winchester, but instead, after marching a few miles he found Banks' pickets who told him Banks was now at Harper's Ferry. He soon reached the general's headquarters by 10:00, delivered his orders, received new ones, dropped off the liberated Maine troopers with LTC Douty, and started back on the return to Front Royal. Around 17:00, the command once again swept through Winchester again causing confusion and camped in the same woods On Tuesday night that they had on Monday night. Rising at dawn's light on June 4, the command lit off on the road to Front Royal and met no rebel forces along the way. Arriving by 11:00, MAJ Whitney reported with COL Allen to MGEN McDowell with Banks' messages and his report on rebel dispositions between Front Royal and Winchester.

On that Wednesday, the same day, as a result of Whitney's report of only the handful of rebels at Winchester, Banks moved his command back into Winchester. Entering the town, the U.S. troops found "not a solitary person appeared in sight, but hundreds of unfriendly eyes were peering through all manner of crevices, expecting momentarily to see the torch applied to all places whence shots had been fired and hot water thrown on the morning of the twenty-fifth day of May." In this action, Whitney's colleagues in the 1st Battalion scouted up the Valley Turnpike for Banks.

 Separated in the Valley and reunited at Warrenton 

Although all of the elements of the regiment were now operating in the Shenandoah, the army kept them attached to their respective operational commands. Douty and his battalion remained with Banks until after the holiday on the 4th of July. Their days were filled with picket duty, patrolling, scouting, and dispatch riding punctuated by numerous skirmishes of which only the one June 24 merited a mention in official reports. Meanwhile, the rest of the regiment under COL Allen remained with McDowell's forces at Front Royal.

Both locations sent out constant scouting patrols. The Federal forces were in the northern, lower valley around Front Royal and Winchester while the Rebels were in the southern, upper valley around Harrisonburg. The large portion of the  valley on either side of Massanutten Mountain was held sporadically by cavalry patrols from Banks and McDowell, and by cavalry and guerrillas by the Confederates. This fluid situation led to men of the regiment taking several prisoners unaware of their presence and, thanks to the support of the local black population escaping the reciprocal situation.

On June 17, the MAJ Stowell was sent with a squadron consisting of Companies K, G, and I returned to Manassas Junction from Front Royal attached to a brigade led by BGEN Hartsuff. . The men in this squadron had an uneventful trek lightened by passing through groves of cherry trees which they scoured of its harvest with the permission of the general.

Douty's battalion remained with Banks. On Sunday, June 29, Companies A (CAPT Thaxter), B (CAPT Tucker), and H (CAPT Summat)reported to COL Tompkins commander of the 1st Vermont Cavalry. McDowell had ordered BGEN Crawford to make a reconnaissance from Front Royal up the valley to see of there were any substantial Rebel forces in Luray. Tompkins was to be his cavalry commander with five companies of the 1st Vermont, three companies of the 1st Maine, and two battalions of the 1st Michigan. Crawford's main force was his infantry brigade. The combined force made Milford by nightfall. On Monday at 08:00, Crawford's cavalry force surprised 200 Rebel cavalry in Luray just as they were getting ready to depart. They pushed them on down the road toward Luray, but found themselves outranged by the rifle-muskets of their opponents as they were armed with sabers, pistols, and only a handful of carbines. The troopers felt that with enough carbines they might have routed their foes, but instead they withdrew back to Crawford in Milford. After gathering intelligence from local Unionists and slaves and seeing no further signs of Confederate forces, Crwaford returned to Front Royal to report in.

The 4th of July was celebrated in both armies in camp with food, games, and patriotic speeches. Both locations continued learning and perfecting their craft by constantly patrolling and picketing.

The regiment was reunited at Warrenton, VA, on July 10, and attached to Bayard's brigade, with which it took part in the Battle of Cedar Mountain. This was the unit's first encounter with elements of the Army of Northern Virginia, albeit only a portion under the command of Stonewall Jackson. Due to the confusion and the large number of prisoners taken in the valley in May and June, forty or more 1st Maine troopers who were being transported to Richmond at this time succeeded in escaping and eluding their guards and rejoined the company in a day or two.

General Pope’s Campaign

Jackson's Valley Campaign had been conducted to relieve the pressure caused by McClellan's Peninsula Campaign had opened in April, but
his advance had been so slow that the Rebels had ample time to run a campaign like Jackson's against Banks. While Banks and McDowell thought they had driven him down the
valley, Jackson had returned with his troops, flushed with success, to the main Rebel army, now known as the Army of Northern Virginia under Robert E. Lee, to fall "like a thunderbolt" upon the right wing of McClellan's army in front of Richmond, and to fight in the Seven Days Battles.

On June 26, 1862, the very day the seven days fight before Richmond began, he forces under Banks, Fremont, and McDowell, which had been acting independently, were oonsolidated into one army, the Army of Virginia under Major General Pope's command. The 1st Maine was initially assigned to BGEN Duryée's 1st Brigade, BGEN Ricketts' 2nd Division of McDowell's III Corps of the Army of Virginia, but Pope stopped assigning cavalry regiments to brigades and formed them into brigades of four or five regiments assigned to a corps and reporting directly to the corps commander. The men of the 1st Maine saw this as an improvement in their use.

The second half of July saw the local streams flooded by several heavy rainfalls. On July 18, MAJ Whitney commanding a squadron of Companies G, I, and K, started reconnaissance across the Rappahannock in a pelting rain storm. After a ride of fifteen miles the river was reached at 15:00, but it was too swollen to cross, so the patrol sheltered in some unoccupied houses at Rappahannock Station. With the river still impassable the next day, Whitney returned to camp that evening. His patrol found out from the pickets that all the streams in the vicinity were flooded, so much so that LT Cary and his squad from Company K, who had been relieved from picket on 18 July, could not get back to camp until the afternoon of the next day.

The last ten days of July were filled with scouting to the Rapidan River and to Madison and the Rapidan River which the troopers of the 1st Maine always found picketed in strength by Stuart's cavalry. On July 22, the 1st Maine was detached from the brigade and sent with Rickett's 2nd Division to Waterloo Bridge to reinforce MGEN Shields, who was expecting an attack from  Jackson. The regiment remained there scouting down to the Rapidan and west to Front Royal until August 5 when it marched to Culpeper Court House to rejoin Bayard's Brigade.

Pope, meanwhile, had begun moving toward Richmond via Culpepper. General Robert E. Lee responded to Pope's dispositions by dispatching Major General Thomas J. "Stonewall" Jackson with 14,000 men to Gordonsville on July 13. Jackson was later reinforced with another 10,000 men by MGEN A.P. Hill's division on July 27. On August 6, Pope moved south to capture the rail junction at Gordonsville, thereby relieving the pressure  on MGEN McClellan's withdrawal from the Virginia Peninsula. The 1st Maine moved to Culpeper Court House and scouted the Rapidan.

 Cedar Mountain 

In response to Pope's threat, Jackson chose to go on the offensive, attacking Pope's vanguard under Banks with local superiority in numbers, before the entire Army of Virginia could be brought to bear on his force. After defeating Banks, he then hoped to move on Culpeper Court House to keep Pope's army separated to allow him to defeat the Federal forces in detail, as he had done during the Valley Campaign. On August 7, Jackson set out for Culpeper. The cavalry under BGEN Beverly Robertson was sent ahead to dispatch the Federal cavalry guarding the fords of the Rapidan River and occupying Madison Court House, threatening Jackson's left flank as his force marched across the Rapidan at Walker's and Cave's Fords and moved northward. Robertson's men cleared the flanks by daylight.

Initial reports of the pickets of Jackson's crossing were disbelieved, but the 1st Maine's brigade commander, Bayard went for to look himself and saw Jackson's corps already across the river in force. He immediately sent messengers to report the crossing to Banks and Pope and recalled all his pickets along the river including those manned by the 1st Maine at Raccoon Ford. He ordered the 1st Pennsylvania to fight a delaying action as he concentrated his brigade and staged a fighting withdrawal toward Culpeper .

A British correspo0ndent was with Banks' infantry's lead elements that had arrived near Cedar Mountain, and he wrote:

Two factors now slowed Jackson's advance, there was a severe heat wave over Virginia at the beginning of August 1862, and his characteristic secrecy about his plans caused confusion among his subordinates. As such, the head of his column had only progressed  by the evening of August 8. Banks ordered Bayard and Buford to place their cavalry his front across the north fork of Cedar Run.The morningCOL Allen drew up the 1st Maine in line of battle at 0600, on the left of the  Culpeper-Orange Turnpike (present day U.S. Route 15), just beyond a cornfield, and facing Rebels who were about one and a quarter mile distant. The cavalry screen was in place by 0630 on August 9. At 11:00, being tasked by Bayard with protecting the left flank, Allen moved the regiment some 300 yards to the extreme left, posting a strong force as pickets still a mile farther to the left extending to the foot of Cedar Mountain (aka Slaughter Mountain). Just before noon, the 1st Maine drove back a small group of Rebel cavalry who reported back to BGEN Jubal Early, whose brigade was the vanguard of Ewell's division. Early brought up his guns and an artillery duel began between the opposing forces as Early's infantry formed a line on the same side of the Culpeper-Orange Turnpike as the 1st Maine in sight of the Cedar Run Ridge, but screened by trees from the regiment. Unbeknownst to them, the 1st Maine was "drawn up in line in front of the enemy's batteries, though unaware of this" As the rest of Ewell's division arrived, they formed on Early's right, anchored against the northern slope of the mountain. From there position the Rebels saw open and broken country with a corn field, and to the left of it an unharvested wheat field, extending to an opposing ridge covered with woods. Early pushed forward to the rise driving Bayard's pickets ahead of him, and when he crested the hill he saw the brigades of Bayard in front of him and on the following wooded ridge, Federal artillery. The artillery opened fore on him and drove him back under the protection of the hill. Early regrouped his line and deployed his batteries in advance of his right on the crest stretching to Cedar Mountain's north slope.

On the left of Bayard's line, the 1st Maine remained until 16:30 when these same rebel batteries shifted their fire from the Federal artillery and infantry and began shelling the regiment. Allen pulled his line of battle back 150 yards and they stopped. They soon saw Rebel cavalry and infantry descending the mountain and moving along with the evident intention of turning the Federal left. Allen placed a line of vedettes in that direction, and sent troopers into the woods to monitor the Rebel advance. Again, the batteries opened fire from the mountainside, and he shifted the line a little to avoid their shells but keeping the pickets and vedettes in place along the left flank.The afternoonIn the afternoon, batteries of Bank's and Jackson engaged in a duel. During this exchange, the troopers of the 1st Maine who had remained with the regiment in Washington D.C. received their baptism of fire but lucked out with poor aim on behalf of Early's gunners followed by the higher priority of the Federal infantry and artillery on the ridge to their right. They would remain spectators to the main action of the battle. They were elevated on the ridge high enough to see the whole battle that would play out south and west of them.

Banks, still smarting from defeat by Jackson in the Valley, was anxious for revenge. Instead of fighting a defensive battle to buy time of the rest of the army's arrival, he decided to take the initiative and attack Jackson before he could fully form his lines despite being outnumbered 2 to 1. A little before 17:00 as the artillery fight began to wane, Banks attacked the Confederate right. Still expecting to face the same cautious opponent from the Valley, Jackson was taken by surprise by "another body of infantry, apparently debouching from one of those valleys hid from the view by the undulating character of the country" and very nearly driven from the field. The Federal advance was swift and threatened to break the Confederate line, prompting Early to come galloping to the front from Cedar Mountain where he was directing troop dispositions. Early's stabilizing presence and the raking fire of the Confederate guns halted the Union infantry's advance on the Confederate right. On the left, the Federals came from the woods directly into the flank of the 1st Virginia Infantry, who under the pressure from attack on two fronts broke for the rear. The Federals pushed on, not waiting to reform their lines, rolling through until they found themselves in the Rebels' rear. The Stonewall Brigade came up and was swept aside before it had a chance to react. Jackson had been hit hard, and his force was threatening to break.

At this point, Jackson rode to rally his men finding his old brigade coming up to reinforce the line. The Stonewall Brigade, inspired by their leader, attacked the Union troops, and drove them back. By this point, Banks' attack was spent and its initial success was unsupported. The Stonewall Brigade drove them back, but soon found themselves alone and unsupported. Banks's line reformed and counterattacked. Although driven back, the Stonewall Brigade's attack had bought enough time for Jackson to reform and send A.P Hill's arriving command into line. Jackson advanced and immediately overwhelmed Union right which collapsed. The Union left began to waver at the right flank's collapse and finally broke from BGEN Isaac R. Trimble's brigade's charge.

Throughout the late afternoon and early evening, the 1st Maine remained on the extreme left flank finding "that this passive service, this being merely interested spectators, this waiting in expectancy of being called into action, [a] much harder experience, and more trying than would have been active participation, no old soldier will question for a moment." Again, for seven of the companies, this was the first real battle that they had been in. The occasional artillery shells that came in their direction had ceased once the infantry divisions swept back and forth across the field.DefeatBy 19:45, the Union line was in full retreat. In a last-ditch effort to help cover his infantry's retreat, Banks sent two squadrons from Buford's cavalry brigade at the Confederate line. They temporarily halted the Rebel advance but at great cost with only 71 of 174 escaping. The Confederate infantry and the 1st Maine's Shandoah Valley foe, the 7th Virginia Cavalry, now commanded by COL William E. "Grumble" Jones' pursued the retreating Federals, nearly capturing Banks and Pope at their headquarters.

As darkness fell, Jackson grew wary as he was unsure of the location of the rest of Pope's army and believing "it imprudent to continue to move forward during the darkness," halted the pursuit. The 1st Maine was still holding their line at 21:30, when some of Robertson's cavalry turned on the 1st Maine, firing and charging upon a portion of Company F (CAPT Boothby), wounding 2 men and killing 1 horse. Two squadrons reinforced Boothby and Company F. They drove the enemy back and held them in check until a rebel battery, that had moved from the mountain to the edge of the woods, opened fire on the reinforced squadron, luckily failing to inflict any damage. COL Allen seeing how  all the other Federal our forces had fallen back, and being without artillery or infantry support in easy range of Rebel infantry at the edge of the woods, pulled the regiment back to the cover of the woods a short distance in rear, and remained until the following morning, with pickets covering the flank. By around 2200, the fighting had ceased, and Jackson consolidated his command on the southern edge of the battlefield.AftermathWhile the 1st Maine suffered relatively minor injuries, the battle was sharp and bloody: Union casualties of 2,353 (314 killed, 1,445 wounded, 594 missing), Confederate 1,338 (231 killed, 1,107 wounded). For two days, Jackson maintained his position south of Cedar Run on the western slope of the mountain, waiting for a Federal attack that did not come. The 1st Maine, as part of Bayard's command, patrolled on Jackson's flanks to keep Banks informed of the Rebels' positions and movement the day after the battle. On Monday, the regiment advanced south, but was stopped at the battlefield by a flag of truce and two companies were detailed to assist the ambulance men in recovering the dead and woumded from the field thereby seeing fist-hand the "horrors of war".

Finally, receiving news that all of Pope's army had arrived at Culpeper Court House, on August 12, Jackson fell back on Gordonsville to a more defensive position behind the Rapidan River. The battle effectively shifted fighting in Virginia from the Virginia Peninsula into northern Virginia. On that day, the 1st Maine, as part of Bayard's command, pushed forward and south again only to find Jackson had departed. They scouted all around the vicinity of the battlefield until Thursday, June 14, 1862 when they pushed further south to the Rapidan to patroll and picket the fords along the river. On Sunday the 17th, Bayard withdrew them back to the vicinity of the battlefield to stand down and recoup, rearm, and replenish mounts and equipment from 13-17 August.

 Skirmishing at Brandy Station and the Rappahannock 

Lest further setbacks with Jackson on the loose, wreaking havoc, Union General-in-Chief Henry Halleck halted Pope’s advance on Gordonsville thereby surrendering initiative to Lee. Lee did not delay in acting.

On August 13, Lee sent Longstreet to reinforce Jackson, and on the following day Lee sent all of his remaining forces. Lee arrived at Gordonsville to take command on August 15. With Pope now on the defensive, Lee could unleash his forces more broadly upon Pope. He massed the Army of Northern Virginia south of Clark's Mountain and planned a turning movement to defeat Pope before McClellan's army could arrive to reinforce it. His plan was to send his cavalry under Stuart, followed by his entire army, north to the Rapidan River on August 18, screened from view by Clark's Mountain. Stuart would cross and destroy the railroad bridge at Somerville Ford and then move around Pope's left flank into the Federal rear, destroying supplies and blocking their possible avenues of retreat.

On Monday, the 18th, Pope began a retreat back to the northern side of the Rappahannock through Culpepper Court House. The 1st Maine, as part of Bayard's command, patrolled on Jackson's flanks to keep Banks informed of the Rebels' positions and movement. After Jackson withdrew south, the regiment was a tasked with screening the retreat and acting as part of the rear guard. Pope became aware of Lee's plan when one of his cavalry patrols captured a copy of the written order. Stuart was almost captured during this raid; his cloak and plumed hat did not escape. Throughout  August 19-20, Pope was spread his army along the northern bank of the Rappahannock from Kelly's Ford northward to just above the railroad bridge at Rappahannock Station (present day Remington, Virginia) and prepared to defend the river crossings. On that day the head of Longstreet's right wing of Lee's army reached Kelly's Ford. On August 20–21, Pope withdrew to the line of the Rappahannock River.  Lee had intended to cross the river above Pope's army to flank it but Pope was expanding northward too quickly. That combined with Rebel logistical difficulties and cavalry movement delays caused the plan to be abandoned.August 20At first light, about six miles south of Brandy Station on the Raccoon Ford Roads (near present-day Stevensburg, VA), two Maine troopers foraging for chickens were captured by Rebel cavalry who were soon spotted by CAPT Taylor of Company G. He was there with two companies on the south side of the river screening the last of the wagons and infantry heading to Rappahannock Station. Although at the extreme limits of visual range for identificationm Taylor correctly guessed who they were when he saw a handkerchief waving at them from a local house. He sent riders back to alert the command and put his companies in line. Shortly after that, Taylor found himself having his pickets driven in by large numbers of Rebel cavalry.

Back at the Brandy Station, the command had been surprised by the news of the enemy's close proximity. Despite initial confusion and frenetic activity, COL Allen had the men in line at Brandy Station athwart the Raccoon Ford Road just behind a rise that screened their presence from the advancing Rebels. When the head of the enemy column crested the rise, he dismounted his seventy-two men armed with carbines and pushing them forward in a skirmish line. The command remained calm and stationary as the Rebel column advanced and began firing. The regiment held their fire until the head of the column was at close range. On the order, the first volley staggered the Rebels and sent them back to the other side of the rise.

After regrouping, they came back as a brigade over the rise in battle lines. The range was close enough to where the regiment could use their pistols effectively as well as carbines. The regiment held the enemy brigade at bay as the 1st Rhode Island joined them. Eventually, Bayard and the rest of the brigade arrived and relieved them.  BGEN Bayard sent COL Allen and the 1st back to the crossing at Rappahannock Station to ensure the last of the retreating column got across the river.  When he received word that the 1st Maine were in contact, Bayard had recalled all scouting parties. Soon, he sent the 1st Rhode Island after the 1st Maine to guard the crossing. The brigade continued to hold the Rebels through the afternon until all his reconnaissance patrols had returned. At that point Bayard began a slow withdrawal to the crossing. The Confederates broke off contact in the late afternoon when a battalion charge by the 1st Pennsylvania drove them back.

At nightfall, the brigade relieved the 1st Maine and the 1st Rhode Island of their picket duties at the crossing. COL Allen and his men crossed the river, set pickets, and bivouacked at the station. The last of Pope's wagon train crossed the river shortly after dark and joined its cohorts at the army's logistics park at Catlett's Station.August 21-25On August 21 and 22 the northern ends of the two armies "waltzed", first Pope and then Longstreet expanding northward along the river. Each army kept its southern end anchored at Kelly's Ford.  Lee then changed his strategy and ordered Jackson's left wing to move much further upriver in order to cross above Pope. By the morning 21 of August,  Lee had changed his strategy and ordered Jackson's left wing to move much further upriver in order to cross above Pope.

The two armies fought a series of minor actions August 22–25 along the Rappahannock River, including Waterloo Bridge, Lee Springs, Freeman's Ford, and Sulphur Springs, resulting in a few hundred casualties. Together, these skirmishes kept the attention of both armies along the river. Heavy rains had swollen the river and Lee was unable to force a crossing. Pope considered an attack across the river to strike Lee's right flank, but he was also stymied by the high water.

Smarting from the increasing audacity of the Federal cavalry whom he and his men held in disdain, Stuart retaliated crossing the Rappahannock at the northern end of Jackson's line. On August 23, Maj. Gen. J.E.B. Stuart's cavalry made a daring raid on Pope's headquarters at Catlett Station, thus showing that the Union right flank was vulnerable to a turning movement. The raid on Pope's headquarters at Catlett's Station arriving just before a thunderstorm, captured the Union commander's dress coat, demonstrating that Pope's right flank was vulnerable to a turning movement, although river flooding brought on by heavy rains would make this difficult. It also revealed to Lee the plans for reinforcing Pope's army, which would eventually bring it to the strength of 130,000 men, more than twice the size of the Army of Northern Virginia.

The 1st Maine's commissary sergeant, Martin T. V. Bowman, was at the station getting rations for the regiment. As the attack began, he, the brigade quartermaster, and another officer narrowly escaped capture by mounting up and darting into a nearby thicket. They rode for several miles, barely escaping the pursuit of Stuart;s troopers who continued to fire into the darkness after Bowman and his companions. Once the Rebels called off their chase, the three men regrouped and realized that they needed to know what was happening back at the station. Bowman volunteered and headed back. By now, the thunderstorm had begun. Torrents of rain and thunder helped mask his approach to the wagon park at the station. As he neared the station, he dismounted and moved on foot. When he reached the station, he saw Stuart's cavalry plundering what they could and burning what they could not carry. Surprised by a mounted Confedere behind him, Bowman literally dodged a bullet and plunged back into the thicket and the dark. Again, he was pursued by numerous riders, but he managed to find his horse, mount it, and make his escape. Returning to his comrades, he reported his observations. The Rebels seemed more determined to capture them this time and pursued them further forcing them across the Rappahannock. After a very close call, Stuart's men departed empty-handed. The three men made it back to the brigade by daylight.

By this time, reinforcements from the Army of the Potomac were arriving from the Peninsula: Maj. Gen. Samuel P. Heintzelman's III Corps, Maj. Gen. Fitz-John Porter's V Corps, and elements of the VI Corps under Brig. Gen. George W. Taylor. Lee's new plan in the face of all these additional forces outnumbering him was to send Jackson and Stuart with half of the army on a flanking march to cut Pope's line of communication, the Orange & Alexandria Railroad. The Hotchkiss journal shows that Jackson, most likely, originally conceived the movement. In the journal entries for March 4 and 6 1863, General Stuart tells Hotchkiss that "Jackson was entitled to all the credit" for the movement and that Lee thought the proposed movement "very hazardous" and "reluctantly consented" to the movement. Pope would be forced to retreat and could be defeated while moving and vulnerable. Jackson departed on August 25 and reached Salem (present-day Marshall) that night.

 Raiding Manassas Station 

The 1st Maine and their brigade brethren spent the next few days constantly patrolling and picketing along the Rappahannock, occasionally trading shots with Rebels on the other bank. On the 26th, Bayard was sent to the right wing and attached to MGEN Fitz John Porter's command. They were then ordered to Thoroughfare Gap. The 1st Maine was sent with the brigade to Catlett Station on August 27, where it remained scouting and patrolling to the west and north looking for Jackson's forces.

On the evening of August 26, after passing around Pope's right flank via Thoroughfare Gap before Porter got there, Jackson's wing of the army struck the Orange & Alexandria Railroad at Bristoe Station and before daybreak August 27 marched to capture and destroy the massive Union supply depot at Manassas Junction. This surprise movement forced Pope into an abrupt retreat from his defensive line along the Rappahannock. On August 27, Jackson routed the New Jersey Brigade of the VI Corps near Bull Run Bridge, mortally wounding its commander George W. Taylor. As he had done in the Shenandoah, Jackson used this opportunity to resupply his troops with captured supplies.

 Thoroughfare Gap 

During the night of August 27 – August 28, Jackson marched his divisions north to the First Bull Run (Manassas) battlefield, where he took position behind an unfinished railroad grade. Pope did not know where Jackson had gone.

Meanwhile back at Thoroughfare Gap, BGEN James B. Ricketts's Second Division of McDowell's III Corps was flanked on August 28 by a Confederate column via Hopewell Gap to the north and by Longstreet's men securing the high ground at Thoroughfare Gap. Ricketts withdrew via Gainesville to Manassas Junction, and Longstreet marched through the gap to join Jackson, thereby ensuring Pope's defeat at Second Bull Run. It allowed Lee's army to unite on the Manassas battlefield.

Bayard's brigade moved to Manassas to look for him. The 1st Maine spent the night of August 28-29 next to Bull Run on the old battleground.

 Second Bull Run The battleAs a result of Jackson's maneuvering, Pope had lost contact with him and did not know where he was. As his columns were moving up to concentrate at Manassas Junction, one of Pope's dispatch riders was captured enroute from McDowell to Sigel and Reynolds. Jackson had put Ewell's and Taliaferro's Divisions in the cover of an unfinished railway cut at the foot of the southeast side of Stony Ridge. Resting hios troops in the cut and in the shade of a grove of trees in the August heat, Jackson reacted quickly when he learned of Pope's plans. 

Jackson mounted his horse and rode alone to the crest of the ridge that lay between the railway cut and Warrenton Turnpike. As he crested the ridge he could see King's 1st Division of McDowell's II Corps marching northeast on the Turnpike approaching its intersection with the Groveton-Sudley Road. The men in the column who saw him several hundred yards away did not recognize him and no unit reacted to his presence. Jackson went back and brought his troops to attack this column passing across his front in order to draw Pope's army into battle. The attack alerted Pope to his position. The fighting, also known as the Brawner's Farm fight, lasted several hours and resulted in a stalemate.

Convinced that he had trapped Jackson, the next morning, August 29, Pope launched a series of assaults against Jackson's position along the unfinished railroad grade. The attacks were repulsed with heavy casualties on both sides. At noon, Longstreet arrived on the field from Thoroughfare Gap and took position on Jackson's right flank. Overnight, Pope was reinforced by Heintzelman's III Corps and Porter's V Corps.

Seemingly unaware that Longstreet was on the field, Pope renewed his attacks on August 30. When massed Confederate artillery devastated Porter's V Corps attack on Jackson's right, Longstreet's wing of 28,000 men counterattacked in the largest simultaneous mass assault of the war. The Union left flank was crushed and the army driven back to Bull Run. Only an effective Union rearguard action prevented a replay of the First Bull Run disaster. Pope's retreat to Centreville was precipitous, nonetheless. The next day, Lee ordered his army to pursue the retreating Union army.The regiment's roleThe 1st Maine marched on the field at daylight on August 29 and formed in line of battle on the right of the army in the morning, and stayed there, under fire most of the time, but without being actively engaged. About noon one battalion, under command of Maj. Stowell, was sent to reconnoitre on the extreme right, and returned later in the day. As Companies G and K stood picket, the remainder of the regiment slept on the field keeping hold of the horses' bridles.

The regiment was early in line the next morning still on the extreme right flank between Matthews Hill and Bull Run. Despite a short Confederate barrage about 09:00, the trooper's day  remained quiet until between 15:00-16:00, when a furious artillery duel began on the right. The 1st Maine was sent to scout the extreme right. After travelling a mile, some of Fitzhugh Lee's batteries opened on it, but no serious damage was done. After completing the mission, they returned to their original position and found Thomas's Division of A.P. Hill's Corps occupying it. Filing around and through the woods North of Matthews Hill, the 1st Maine came into the open field and found Gen. Pope's force beginning to give way.

As a growing retreat followed, they were posted across the Warrenton Turnpike between Henry And Matthews Hills and received the order, "draw sabre," to stop troops from leaving the field; despite their great efforts, the regiment were overwhelmed by the numbers. After a while, COL Allen and his command withdrew half a mile to the northeast side of Young's Branch forming up to again try to keep order and rally the retreating soldiers. When the troopers soon found that the Rebel artillery had their range, COL Allen pulled the regiment back further, this time crossing Bull Run stream, where the line was again formed at dusk. Finally the regiment moved back to Centreville about midnight, and camped for the night, being in the screen between the enemy and Pope's army.

The regiment was not actively engaged in the battle, though under fire a great portion of the· time. Its loss was therefore slight with one or two men taken prisoner, who were serving as orderlies and captured while carrying dispatches.AftermathThe day after the battle, Sunday, August 31, was relatively quiet. The regiment scouted toward Cub Run, and after a bit of a scrap with the enemy, returned and picketed Warrenton Turnpike a just before Germantown a couple of miles east of Centreville.

 Chantilly 

Making a wide flanking march, Jackson hoped to cut off the Union retreat from Bull Run. On September 1, beyond Chantilly Plantation on the Little River Turnpike near Ox Hill, Jackson sent his divisions against two Union divisions under Maj. Gens. Philip Kearny and Isaac Stevens. Confederate attacks were stopped by fierce fighting during a severe thunderstorm. Union generals Stevens and Kearny were both killed.

The 1st Maine remained on picket south of the action at Chantilly until early evening. The regiment received orders to move back to Fairfax Court House and join Reno's· 2nd Division of Burnside's IX Corps. Recognizing that his army was still in danger at Fairfax Courthouse, Pope ordered the retreat to continue to Washington.

On Tuesday, September 2, the 1st Maine moved toward Alexandria, three or four miles, and stood provost duty, stopping stragglers until 15:00, when the retreat to Washington resumed. The troopers camped in a peach orchard, three miles out of Alexandria. From there they scouted up and back on the south side of the Potomac.

The campaign of Pope was over, and McClellan took command of all US Army forces near Washington September 2.

Maryland Campaign

The Maryland Campaign occurred September 4–20, 1862.

Following his victory in the northern Virginia campaign, Lee invaded the north with 55,000 men through the Shenandoah Valley starting on September 4, 1862. His objectives were to resupply his army outside of the war-torn Virginia theater thereby damaging Northern morale in the 1862 mid-term elections, and to inspire the citizens of Maryland to rise up and secede from the United States. He split his army so he could continue north into Maryland while Jackson simultaneously captured Harpers Ferry. McClellan accidentally found a copy of Lee's orders to his subordinate commanders and planned to isolate and defeat the separated portions of Lee's army.

The campaign consisted of Lee's movements and McClellans responses through western Maryland and Virginia. The campaign contained the: Battle of Mile Hill, Battle of Harpers Ferry, Battle of South Mountain, Battle of Crampton's Gap Battle of Antietam, Battle of Shepherdstown, Chambersburg Raid, and Battle of Unison.

The 1st Maine would find itself quite busy over the course of the campaign.

 October 1862 Rappahannock 

Arriving in Washington on Sep 4, it was attached to Burnside's Corps and engaged the Lee's forces at Frederick, MD, on September 12, 1862. Company G, acting as BGEN Reno's bodyguard, took part in the Battle of South Mountain, Companies M and H, under MGEN Porter, in that of Antietam. The regiment (except Companies G, M, and H) remained at Frederick, from Sep 12 to Nov 2, up to which period it had lost in action and worn out in service nearly 700 horses.

In October, the regiment was reunited and operated attached to Rush's 3rd Brigade of BGEN Pleasonton's Cavalry Division of MGEN Williams' XII Corps alongside the 4th Pennsylvania  and 6th Pennsylvania (due to their early use of 9-foot lances, also known as "Rush's Lancers"), with whom they patrolled northwest Maryland and south cent5ral Pennsylvania skirmishing with Stuart's cavalry.

In December 1862, during Battle of Fredericksburg, the regiment's battalions and companies were spread through MGEN William B. Franklin's Left Grand Division of the Army of the Potomac. The 1st Maine got through the Fredericksburg campaign relatively unscathed by the Army of Northern Virginia. It went into winter quarters outside Fredericksburg and mounted pickets and security patrols to fend off marauding rebels through the Holiday Season and into the new year.

Hard service in 1863

In camp before the onset of activity in the Spring, the 1st Maine as well as the entire of the cavalry of the Army of the Potomac received breech-loading carbines (two Michigan regiments received repeating Spencer rifles). The whole of the cavalry now had the firepower that would enable them to hold, tie down, and delay rebel infantry until their own infantry could arrive on the scene of battle. While not as rapid in fire as the later repeating carbines and rifles, the breech loaders still increased the rate of fire to three and four times that of the rebel muzzle-loading Enfields and Springfields and could outrange the rebel cavalry's shotguns. The standard trooper in the 1st was now armed with a saber, two Colt .44 "Army" pistols, and a single-shot Burnside breech-loading carbines (some kept privately purchased Sharps Carbines). As with the rest of the Cavalry Corps, the saber and pistols were for combat from the saddle and the carbine was for dismounted combat.

The year would be the turning point in the Eastern Theater, and the severity of the service to which the men of this regiment were subjected during the campaigns of 1863, may be inferred from a bare recital of the battles in which they were subsequently engaged and from data showing some of their heaviest losses. The battles, in addition to those above mentioned, occurred during the following campaigns/expeditions.

Stoneman's raid and the Chancellorsville Campaign
 

In April 1863, MGEN Joseph Hooker sent MGEN George Stoneman to cut Lee's line of supply on the Orange and Alexandria and Virginia Central Railroads at the town of Gordonsville. Hooker hoped Lee would withdraw from Fredericksburg since he would be cut off from supplies and transportation. Hooker assured Stoneman that he would keep in communications with him while he was on the raid. This expedition was also a significant change in the use of Federal Cavalry. The cavalry was beginning to expand from their traditional screening/scouting roles and add the role of a mounted strike force tasked with finding and fighting the enemy. Hooker directed Stoneman in his orders on April 12, 1863, "Let your watchword be fight, and let all your orders be fight, fight, fight."

The raid would be conducted with the men carrying light loads concentrating on weapons and ammunition. Sustenance for man and beast were to be taken from rebel territory. The 1st in the lead of COL Kilpatrick's 1st Brigade of BGEN David McM. Gregg's 2nd Division seized the bridge across the river at Rappahannock Station, but further reconnaissance found the roads beyond to be nearly impassable in the rain and mud. The men's eagerness was thwarted as heavy spring rains kept the bulk of the force on the Federal side of the river looking for a suitable spot to get across in force. To keep the force undetected, Stoneman had given the order that no fires would be allowed after dark for the duration of the march.

Rebel scouts had noticed some cavalry moving out of Falmouth but were ignorant of its intent. The 1st Maine's LT Stone of Company A was acting as the assistant brigade quartermaster when he was captured by a small party of Mosby's Rangers and taken to Warrenton to get back across the river for interrogation. The rain had increased the size and speed of the river at the ford so that his captors were reluctant to move into the stream. To goad his men, the party's commander, a LT Paine, spurred his horse into the river, and was promptly swept off. Despite being a prisoner, Paine moved into the river downstream, while his other captors dithered and grabbed his captor saving his life. In return, he was promised he would be sent directly to Lee's headquarters with a recommendation to be returned without exchange as reward for this act. While being transported to Richmond, Paine, on Stone's horse, and his party were in turn captured by the 8th Illinois in COL Horace B. Sargent's 1st Brigade of BGEN William W. Averell's 1st Division of this expedition. Stone spent barely a week away from the regiment and was back with his horse by Wednesday, April 22.

By the evening of April 19, Stoneman had the command shed "all men and horses not in good condition, and all extra baggage, to the rear, and prepare for long and rapid marches, day and night, as the cavalry was about to show an indulgent government that the money and pains taken to render this arm of the service efficient was not thrown away.'" The rain and the mud still hindered the force to the extent that by Wednesday, April 22, the 1st Maine found itself in Warrenton, VA still on the Federal side of the river. The men found a respite in that being within a town, they were allowed to light fires. They remained in Warrenton through Saturday, April 25.

 Moving out
On April 25, the orders were modified to cross the Rappahannock north-west of Fredericksburg on the evening of the 28th, or the morning of the 29th, and move in two columns, operating on the line of the Orange & Alexandria railroad and Culpeper Road. After moving out during the night of April 28/29, the column was in motion, and before noon was at Kelly's ford, on the Rappahannock, where it crossed on a pontoon bridge. Once across, the force dismounted a short distance beyond the river until dark when they mounted up and moved toward Richmond. Keeping the horses saddled and the men under arms, Stoneman split his force in three for the next day's movement. Once again, Stoneman had his subordinates cull any men or mounts deemed unfit for the remainder of the expedition sent back across the river.

The 1st Maine was in Kilpatrick's 1st Brigade of Gregg's 2nd Division riding with Stoneman to arrive on the Virginia Central's rail line at Louisa Courthouse southeast of Gordonsville from the southeast while Averell's 1st Division with three brigades would come down the Orange & Alexandria from the north. A beefed-up reserve brigade with four regular cavalry and one volunteer regiments under BGEN John Buford followed equidistant behind the two wings. The operations the next day, the 30th, after crossing, consisted in driving in the outposts which were encountered on both roads. The 1st provided security for crossing the Rapidan at Raccoon ford, and troopers were pleased to find that the copper and brass rounds for their carbines were unaffected by the fording of the swollen streams and the torrential rains.

Still not lighting campfires to avoid rebel detection, the forces continued their advance south through Unionville and Thornhill to get between the Army of Northern Virginia and Richmond and east of Gordonsville. unopposed by any significant opposition. This had a further positive effect on the Federal Cavalrymen's self-esteem as well as a break in the weather. The men of the 1st noted that they were capturing prisoners, weapons, horses, mules, and fodder with every small skirmish yet they were seeing no signs of the Army of Northern Virginia's retreat from the vicinity of Fredericksburg. Instead, the men of the 1st saw the tracks of infantry and cavalry heading to Fredericksburg and points upriver on the Rappahannock. Stoneman reported these indications back to Hooker, but received no response so was unaware of the result of his intelligence.

 Arriving at Louisa
After slogging through rain and fog for three days, with the 1st Maine acting as its division's rear guard, the rains cleared as they crossed the North Anna River. On May 1, the unit rotated to the advance guard and at 01:00 (at night) on May 2, arrived at Louisa Courthouse on the Virginia Central Railroad thirteen miles southwest of the junction at Gordonsville. Stoneman consolidated his forces at Louisa Court House on the Virginia Central Railroad at 10:00 where they began destroying the rails and equipment found there. He had Averell come south through Gordonsville to meet him at Louisa. As he waited for Averell, Stoneman sent the regular officer, the 1st Maine's Adjutant, CAPT Tucker, with its Companies B and I northwest up the railway toward Gordonsville to find the enemy. Stoneman had not heard anything from Hooker and was unaware of any effect that his presence and actions were having on Lee's army. Men of the 1st and the rest of the force were ignorant of the impending doom facing XI Corp roughly 30 miles to the northeast.

Three miles outside Louisa, the two companies made contact and drove back the rebel pickets only to find themselves facing five companies of rebel cavalry. They managed to cut their way out of an encirclement and made it back to the main force. Stoneman opted to send out small parties to destroy as much infrastructure and supplies as possible from his stop at Louisa. Averell joined him on May 3. While these forays had commenced, Stoneman received orders that day from Hooker (the first communication sent his way since crossing the Rappahannock) recalling him to the main body of the Army of the Potomac then heavily engaged at Chancellorsville. At the same time, he was seeing the limit of endurance for his men and horses nearing.

Stoneman began sending patrols east toward the Richmond, Fredericksburg and Potomac Railroad on May 4, with the intent to move closer between Richmond and Fredericksburg and destroy as much rail equipment and military supplies as he could on the way back to the army. The 1st drew rear guard duty again and were instructed to build large numbers of fires around Louisa to deceive the 500 odd rebel cavalrymen who had mixed it up with CAPT Tucker and monitored the expedition from a distance. Instead of going into camp for the night, the column headed east on the Richmond Pike, a clear macadamized road. Making good progress on the hardtop, the column halted at Thompson's Crossroads. Stoneman again divided his force into several expeditions sent out in different directions.

The 1st Maine, with Gregg, was sent to Rockville fifteen miles northwest of Richmond and west of Ashland Station on the Richmond, Fredericksburg, and Potomac line. From there even smaller detachments fanned out. After burning bridges across creeks and rivers, firing warehouses, and rolling stock, on May 6, Gregg moved his group north to rejoin Stoneman.

As the elements were regrouping, Stoneman found that a brigade-sized contingent under Kilpatrick (not including the 1st Maine) sent southeast had been cut off by an aroused rebel cavalry and forced to return to Union lines down at Yorktown. Unknown to him, the rebels having defeated Hooker were turning their attention to the raiders. As he was finding out, "To take the enemy by surprise and penetrate his country was easy enough; to withdraw from it was a more difficult matter."

 Heading back
To keep the rebel forces marshalling against him from seizing the initiative, Stoneman had sent Buford back to Louisa and Gordonsville on May 5. With the 1st rotated back to the advance guard, the force crossed the Pamunkey River and made camp to wait for its outliers to return. By May 6, Buford had returned to Stoneman. Crossing the Rapidan again at Raccoon ford, the force was shadowed by ever increasing numbers of rebel horsemen on the 7th reaching Kelly's ford at midnight. The three days of rain made the ford risky to cross in the darkness.

At daybreak on May 8, Stoneman's remaining force began swimming across the Rappahannock with the men of the 1st Maine again realizing no debilitating effect on their metal carbine cartridges. At the end of the day, the 1st Maine was one of the first units of the expedition to get to the encampment at Bealton, twenty miles upriver from the Army of the Potomac's headquarters at Falmouth. By May 10, all the regiments less Kilpatrick's were reunited at Bealton. While bone weary, the Federal cavalrymen were in high morale in stark contrast to the rest of the army stung by a particularly galling defeat at the Battle of Chancellorsville.

 Aftermath
This raid took a toll on the regiment, but it and the rest of the army's cavalry branch were gaining in combat effectiveness. Regardless of the success or failure of the daring Stoneman's raid, it instilled a growing sense of competence and confidence among the men of the Federal cavalry. Chaplain Merrill called the raid "one of the most remarkable achievements in the history of modern warfare" and one of the men encapsulated the new-found confidence writing, "It was ever after a matter of pride with the boys that they were on Stoneman's Raid." Reflecting on the raid twenty years later, Edward Tobie wrote:
Starting with but two days' rations, after that was gone the boys lived on ham, flour and meal obtained from the country, cooked when they had time to cook, and eaten raw when necessary. As for rest and sleep, five nights there was no sleep exceed what was stolen in the saddles, and the rations of sleep were short and of an inferior quality during the rest of the time ; some of the men seemed demented at times from loss of sleep, and acted half crazed. Three days and nights there was continuous marching, fighting, scouting, and picketing, and in fact pretty much of the whole time the boys had been actively employed.

Gettysburg campaign

Regrouping, resupplying, and training further with their new carbines, the regiment prepared for the next engagement. Although the morale of the Cavalry Corps was high due to the perceived success of Stoneman's Raid, Hooker used Stoneman as a scapegoat and relieved him of command. The 1st Maine remained under Kilpatrick in the 1st Brigade of Gregg's 3rd Division. The brigade was joined by a company of cavalry from the District of Columbia under CAPT William H Orton (who would later join the 1st Maine the following year with the remainder of the 1st DC Cavalry). BGEN Pleasanton was promoted to command the Corp with BGEN Buford taking over his 1st Division.

After Chancellorsville, Lee began an invasion up the Shenandoah into the Maryland and Pennsylvania with two goals in mind. The first was to attack the US public's will to fight, and the second was to give the agricultural economy of northern Virginia a chance to rebound from the Army of the Potomac and produce a harvest that could sustain the rebel armies in the field by foraging and plundering the lush, productive country of south central Pennsylvania. To do this successfully, he would need MGEN Stuart's Confederate cavalry force to scout and screen for his main body. This would lead to the 1st Maine having an eventful experience during the ensuing Gettysburg Campaign.

 Brandy Station

Around Brandy Station, Stuart had about 9,500 men in five cavalry brigades, led by BGENs Hampton, Robertson, and Jones, and COL Munford (temporarily commanding Lee's brigade), plus horse artillery. He was unaware that Pleasanton had organized his command into two wings of 11,000 men across the Rappahannock River. Buford, accompanied by Pleasanton, led the right wing of three cavalry brigades and horse artillery augmented by an infantry brigade from the V Corps. The 1st Maine rode in the left wing, led by Gregg, similarly composed and augmented in the 3rd Cavalry Division, led by Gregg.
To remove the threat of Stuart raiding his supply lies from Brandy Station, Hooker ordered Pleasonton to make a "spoiling raid," to "disperse and destroy" the Confederates. In Pleasonton's attack plan, the 1st Maine in Gregg's wing would cross at Kelly's Ford, six miles (10 km) downstream to the southeast of Brandy station as the left pincer in a planned double envelopment. Buford's wing would cross further north at Beverly Ford. At dawn on June 9, 1863, the U.S. forces advanced.

Buford's wing made first contact and surprised the Confederates at St. James Church. Buford failed to turn the Confederate left and dislodge the artillery that was blocking the direct route to Brandy Station. Men of the 1st Maine could hear cannon fire from Buford's force as they crossed Kelly's Ford. After initial heavy losses, Buford's men were amazed to see the Confederates began pulling back. Gregg's wing, finding their planned route blocked by Robertson's brigade, found a completely unguarded and more circuitous route surprising the rebels and forcing the withdrawal from Buford.

The 1st Maine was in the second bride to arrive on scene. Between Gregg and Buford at St. James battle was Fleetwood Hill, Stuart's headquarters the previous night, which Stuart and most of his staff had left for St. James Church. A howitzer, left in the rear because of inadequate ammunition, fired a few shots that delayed the Union advance as they sent out skirmishers and returned cannon fire. When the first brigade in Gregg's wing under COL Wyndham charged up the western slope of Fleetwood and neared the crest they put to flight, the lead elements of Jones's brigade, which had just withdrawn from St. James Church. Wyndham set up a battery on the hill next to the rebel howitzer. The 1st Maine, in the next brigade, led by COL Kilpatrick, swung around east of Brandy Station and formed up on the southern end and the eastern slope of Fleetwood Hill on the right of Wyndham's brigade. A furious scrap began with charges moving back and forth over the hill by Wyndham and his foe, Jones.

Kilpatrick kept feeding his brigade into the fight alongside Wyndham's brigade and seemed to be gaining the upper hand. His former regiment, the 2nd New York (also known as the Harris Light Cavalry) flooded up the hill, only to discover that their appearance coincided with the arrival of Hampton's brigade, with a battery of five guns to augment the howitzer, who drove them back over the crest and captured the Federal battery. The regiment was shattered and fled back down the hill. While rallying the remnants of his old regiment, Kilpatrick galloped up to COL Douty asking, "Colonel Douty, what can you do with your regiment?" Douty answered confidently, "I can drive the rebels." At that, Kilpatrick turned to the regiment and shouted, "Men of Maine! You must save the day! Follow me!" This call had an immediate effect on the regiment.

With a shout at the top of their lungs, "in one solid mass this splendid regiment circled first to the right, and then moving in a straight line at a run struck the rebel columns in flank. The shock was terrific! Down went the rebels before this wild rush of maddened horses, men, biting sabres, and whistling balls." The charge of the 1st Maine saved the Federal guns near Fleetwood Hill from capture. The Federal battery was manned and withdrew off the hill.

During the charge and pursuit, the regiment separated into two groups. One remained near the crest of Fleetwood Hill mopping up in melee with dismounted rebels. Some of the regiment dismounted and opened fire with their carbines on Confederates withdrawing to the north along the crest. LTC Smith, in command of this contingent, soon found himself alone and almost cut off. He quickly rallied and gathered more than half the regiment around him. Once gathered, Smith led his group down the hill to join COL Douty. As they left the crest, no one manned or removed the Confederate guns on the crest.

COL Douty, meanwhile, was with the other group further along in pursuit of fleeing rebel horsemen and began trying to reform this group to avoid a dissipation of his combat power. Douty quickly realized while the chase had carried them over a mile of open ground, he had woods on either side into which rebels had fled. As he rallied his command, he could see the enemy massing for an attack in his rear. He formed his group in column and charged the still-forming line of Hampton's men. He smashed through the line, wheeled around on the other side, and charged again thoroughly scattering the rebel troopers.

As Smith and his contingent came up to meet Douty, they realized that they were surrounded. The rebels had flooded back toward the hill in small groups including artillerymen who had taken back their abandoned guns. The two groups rallied around COL Doughty and LTC Smith. With Smith in the lead, the regiment advanced on the battery at pace "as if inviting death." Firing from the rebels died off as their troopers moved out of the battery's line of fire and the gunners sighted their guns. When Smith saw the battery preparing to fire, he ordered the column to turn right just before the guns fired loads of grape and shell. The abrupt move left the discharge tearing through empty space and the column reformed before the battery could reposition their weapons and swept around to the right of the crest.

The regiment lost no men in the last action and made it back over the crest to the origin of their charge. In the last action, the Maine men had learned the valuable lesson that that cohesion gave them power and safety in numbers as demonstrated in Douty's two charges in the open ground and Smith's turn to dodge grape and shell from the rebels. Several sweeps over the hill during the day had left it remaining in Confederate hands. Near sunset, Pleasonton ordered a general withdrawal, and the ten-hour battle was over.

The 1st Maine's losses in casualties and prisoners were almost all troopers who had been separated from the main two bodies. All told, this action had cost the regiment one killed, two wounded, seven ·wounded and taken prisoner, and twenty-­eight taken prisoner. They had also taken seventy-six rebel prisoners and 2nd South Carolina's colors. Two rebel artillery pieces were taken off the hill but abandoned in the withdrawal back across the Rappahannock.

Much like the earlier raid (that is, not really succeeding in its initial objectives) the men of the 1st Maine gained more confidence from their action. Although a rebel tactical victory (although derided as a defeat in rebel press as a defeat), for the first time in the War, they matched the rebel cavalry in skill and determination. As they recouped, Edward P. Tobie observed, "[A] higher value attaches to Brandy Station as affecting the [1st Maine]. ... It was ... the first time it had ever tasted ... the fruit of victory. The battle aroused its latent powers, and awoke it ... to a new career. It became self-reliant, and began to comprehend its own possibilities. It became inspired with an invincible spirit that never again forsook it."

Of note, the battle had "indisputably delayed Robert E. Lee's advance northward by one full day" which would have a knock-on effect on the Army of Northern Virginia and its movements in the remainder of the campaign.

 Battle of Aldie

The Battle of Aldie took place on June 17, 1863, in Loudoun County, Virginia. It was the first in a series of small battles along the Ashby's Gap Turnpike in which Stuart's forces successfully delayed Pleasonton's thrust across the Loudoun Valley, depriving him of the opportunity to locate the Army of Northern Virginia which was trying to get a jump on the Army of the Potomac into Pennsylvania via the Shenandoah Valley.

Despite the positive performance of the Cavalry Corps at Brandy Station Hooker grew increasingly frustrated with Pleasonton's inability to locate Lee's main body. Pleasonton reorganized his corps again from two wings into three divisions. He relieved COL Alfred N. Duffié with the 1st Maine's brigade commander, Kilpatrick. The Maine men were now part of Gregg's 2nd Division's 3rd Brigade now commanded by Gregg's cousin, COL John Irvin Gregg. Pleasonton took Company I to serve as escorts and orderlies at his headquarters. Company L detached, under CAPT Constantine Taylor to do the same at MGEN John F. Reynolds 's I Corps' headquarters. The remaining ten companies stayed under COL Douty's command in the 3rd Brigade.

On June 17, Pleasonton decided to push the 2nd Division twenty miles from Manassas Junction westward down the Little River Turnpike to Aldie. Aldie was tactically important in that near the village the Little River Turnpike intersected both the Ashby's Gap Turnpike and Snicker's Gap Turnpike, which respectively led through Ashby's Gap and Snickers Gap in the Bull Run Mountains, a ridge east of the Blue Ridge Mountain into the valley. The 1st Maine arrived there with the 3rd Brigade at 14:00 to find a severe cavalry fight already underway.

Just east of the village Kilpatrick's division led by 1st Massachusetts had driven COL Thomas T. Munford's's pickets back upon initial contact through the town. Around the same time, the rest of Munford's brigade under the COL Williams Carter Wickham arrived at Dover Mills, a small hamlet on the Little River west of Aldie where the U.S. forces realized that Munford's regiments outnumbered them. The rebels set up a position west of the town that controlled the road leading from it. Wickham ordered COL Thomas L. Rosser to take the 5th Virginia to locate a campsite closer to Aldie. As they moved east, they ran into and easily drove back Kilpatrick's right flank regiment, the 1st Massachusetts, through Aldie to the main Union body. Rosser pulled back through town and deployed west along a ridge that covered the two roads leading out of Aldie and waited the arrival of Munford. As Rosser withdrew west, he repulsed a swift counterattack by 1st Massachusetts and 4th New York securing his hold on the Ashby's Gap Turnpike with a sharpshooter detachment under CAPT Boston behind a stonewall east of the William Adam farmhouse at the foot of the hill at Snicker's Gap.

Kilpatrick then turned his attention towards the Snicker's Gap Turnpike.  As Mumford brought forward the 1st, 2nd, 3rd, and 4th Virginia Cavalry, an artillery duel ensued. A furious fight erupted, which at first went in favor of Munford as Federal charges were met, stopped, and then forced back by the withering volley of sharpshooters entrenched along a stone wall. The 1st Massachusetts Cavalry was trapped in a blind curve on the west of Snicker's Gap Turnpike and was mauled, losing 198 of 294 men in the eight companies that were engaged. Gregg sent the 1st Maine to the left to report to Kilpatrick on his left. When Gregg found himself actively engaged in close combat on the east side of the hill at Snicker's Gap Turnpike, he recalled the 1st Maine ordering them to wheel right and attack over the crest with sabers drawn. Douty had only six companies with him as four under LTC Smith had gone too far west to recall.

As Douty formed the companies, they were met by Kilpatrick and the withdrawing 1st Massachusetts:
 "Kilpatrick was among them, but when he saw an unbroken front of live men, with glistening sabres drawn, he instantly stopped. His moistened features were covered with dust; his countenance was dejected and sad; the fire and the flash of his eyes were gone, and he looked indeed "a ruined man." "What regiment is this?" he asked, in tones that did not betray him. "First Maine!" shouted a dozen throats. The response was electric. Then we heard the· old, familiar, clear-ringing tones, and saw his countenance brighten to a smile, his eyes flash, and his whole frame fill with enthusiasm, as commanded: "Forward. First Maine! You saved the field at Brandy Station, and you can do it here! Are there twelve men who will follow me?" He turned instantly, and forty boys of Co. H, followed by Co. D. with deafening yells and flashing sabres, charged down the hill and met the victorious rebels, brave, bold, determined fellows, just at the road, and in an instant we were among them; nor would they turn till they felt the steel borne by braver and stronger arms than theirs."

COL Doughty and CAPT Summat were on the extreme left of the regiment as they had been between the fourth and fifth company in the line of march. As Kilpatrick turned around to the rebels, Doughty and Summat galloped alongside him in front of the rest of the regiment. The regiment cleared all rebels before it. On its right, the 6th Ohio overran Boston's detachment at the stonewall beyond the Adam farmhouse on Ashby's Gap Turnpike, capturing or killing most of his men. As the charge met the rebels, LTC Smith had rejoined and immediately fell in the sweep down the hill. In the ensuing action, three sergeants of Company H captured the colors of the 4th Virginia. As the tide finally turned in the fading light, the Maine troopers found COL Doughty and CAPT Summat fatally shot from their saddles. LTC Smith assumed command of the regiment.

The fighting died down around 20:00 as Munford withdrew his command west towards Middleburg. Despite Pleasonton's tactical victory, Munford had accomplished his mission of keeping Hooker from knowing Lee's location.

Despite their high morale from their successful charge and the capture of enemy colors, the 1st Maine had suffered the notable loss of its commander, COL Douty, as well as a popular company commander, CAPT Summat. The scrap had been costly with the loss from this battle being five men killed, one mortally wounded, seventeen wounded, one mortally wounded and taken prisoner, one wounded and taken prisoner, four taken prisoner, and over 200 horses – a significant blow to the command.

 Middleburg

 Moving north

 Gettysburg

Bristoe campaign

Mine Run campaign

Union cavalry supremacy 1864–1865

It also moved with the cavalry corps on Gen. Sheridan's first raid. May 9, 1864, until within 3 miles of Richmond.  In the engagement at Trevilian Station, June 24, 1864, its loss was 10 officers and 58 enlisted men. During August of this year its loss in killed, wounded and missing was 49 men and 75 horses, and the total casualties during 1864 amounted to 295 officers and enlisted men.

In August 1864, seven companies of the 1st D. C. cavalry were transferred and assigned to the several companies of this regiment by a special order of the war department. The original members of the regiment whose term of service expired November 4, 1864, were mustered out at Augusta, ME, on November 25, while the regiment, now composed of veterans, recruits and members of the 1st D. C. cavalry whose term had not expired, participated in the closing battles of the war; was mustered out of the U. S. service at Petersburg, VA, August 1, 1865, and arrived in Augusta, ME., on August 9, 1865.

Affiliations, battle honors, detailed service, and casualties

Organizational affiliation
The 1st Maine Volunteer Cavalry Regiment was organized at Augusta, ME and served with the following organizations:
 March 1862, Miles' Brigade defending Baltimore and Ohio Railroad (2nd Battalion)
 April 1862, Hatch's Cavalry Brigade. Brig., Banks' V Corps, and Department of the Shenandoah (2nd Battalion).
 March 1862, Abercrombie's Cavalry Brigade, McDowell's Department of the Rappahannock (1st and 3rd Battalions)
 April 1862, Bayard's Cavalry Brigade, Department of the Rappahannock (1st and 3rd Battalions).
 May 1862, Edward Ord's Divisional Cavalry, McDowell's Department of the Rappahannock. (1st and 3rd Battalions)
 June 1862, Bayard's Cavalry Brigade, III Corps, Army of Virginia (Reunited Regiment.).
 September 1-14, 1862, Bayard's Cavalry Brigade, Cavalry Division, Army of the Potomac.
 September 14-17, Porter's V Corps Esort, Army of the Potomac (Company A)
 September 14-17, Reno's IX Corps Esort, Army of the Potomac (Company G)
 September 14-17,Cavalry Division Unattached,  Williams' XII  Corps, Army of the Potomac (Remainder of Regiment)
 December 11-15, Reynolds' I Corps Esort, Franklin's Left Grand Division, Army of the Potomac (Company L)
 December 11-15, Bayard's Cavalry Brigade, Newton's 3rd Division, Smith's VI Corps, Franklin's Left Grand Division, Army of the Potomac (Remainder of Regiment)
 December 31 1862, Gregg's's Cavalry Brigade, III Corps, Army of the Potomac.
 February 1863, 1st Brig., 3rd Division, Cavalry Corps, Army of the Potomac.
 June 1863, 3rd Brig., 2nd Division, Cavalry Corps, Army of the Potomac.
 August 1863, 2nd Brig., 2nd Division, Cavalry Corps, Army of the Potomac.
 October 1864, 3rd Brig., 2nd Division, Cavalry Corps, Army of the Potomac.
 May 1865, Department of Virginia
Mustered out August 1, 1865.

List of battles
The official list of battles in which the regiment bore a part:

 First Battle of Winchester
 Battle of Cedar Mountain
 Battle of White Sulphur Springs
 Second Battle of Bull Run
 Battle of South Mountain
 Battle of Antietam
 Battle of Fredericksburg
 Second Battle of Rappahannock Station
 Battle of Brandy Station
 Battle of Aldie
 Battle of Middleburg
 Battle of Upperville
 Battle of Gettysburg
 Battle of Shepherdstown
 Battle of Mine Run
 Kilpatrick's Raid on Richmond
 Battle of Old Church
 Battle of Todd's Tavern
 Ground Squirrel Bridge
 Battle of Haw's Shop
 Battle of Cold Harbor
 Battle of Trevilian Station
 Battle of Saint Mary's Church
 First Battle of Deep Bottom
 Second Battle of Ream's Station
 Battle of Vaughan Road
 Battle of Boydton Plank Road
 The Bellfield Raid

Detailed service

 1861 
 Organized at Augusta and mustered on November 5, 1861.

 1862 
 Regiment ordered to Washington DC
 Companies "A," "D," "E" and "F" transit March 14–19
 Companies "B," "I," "H" and "M" transit March 19–24
 Companies "C," "G," "K" and "L" transit March 19–28
 Companies "A," "B," "E," "H" and *'M" (1st Battalion) Ordered to Harper's Ferry, WV, and guard duty along Baltimore & Ohio Railroad March 31 – May 19
 Moved to Strasburg and operations in the Shenandoah Valley May 15 – June 17
 Action at Woodstock May 21
 Strasburg (Cos. "H" and "M") May 22
 Middletown May 24
 Winchester May 25
 Retreat to Williamsport May 25–26
 Winchester June 3. Milford June 24
 Reconnaissance to Front Royal June 29–30.
 Luray June 30.
 Rejoin Regiment at Warrenton July 10.
 Companies "C," "D," "F," "G," "I," "K" and "L" (Regiment, 2nd and 3rd Battalions) Depart Washington, DC for Warrenton Junction, VA April 5
 Fairfax Court House April 5
 Manassas Junction April 6
 Warrenton Junction April 7
 In camp at Warrenton Junction April 7 – May 12 Reconnaissance to the Rappahannock April 15 (Co. "C")
 Reconnaissance to Liberty Church, VA April 16 (Detachment)
 Reconnaissance to Culpeper Court House, VA May 4–5.
 Move via Elk Run and Stafford Court House to Falmouth, VA May 12–14
 In camp at Falmouth May 12–25 Depart Falmouth for Alexandria, rerouted to join McDowell at Manassas Junction May 25
 Milford July 2
 Winchester July 3
 Sperryville July 5
 Regiment scouting on the Rappahannock during July Reconnaissance to James City July 22–24.
 Slaughter House August 7.
 Robinson River August 8.
 Battle of Cedar Mountain August 9
 Pope's Campaign in Northern Virginia August 16 – September 2. Stevensburg, Raccoon Ford and Brandy Station August 20
 Beverly Ford August 20. Fords of the Rappahannock August 21–23
 Rappahannock Station August 24–25
 Sulphur Springs August 27
 Thoroughfare Gap August 28
 Groveton August 29
 Bull Run August 30
 Mountsville, Centerville, Chantilly, and Germantown August 31
 Chantilly September 1
 Frederick, Md., September 7 and 12.
 South Mountain September 14. Antietam September 16–17
 At Frederick, Md., till November 2
 Manassas Junction October 24
 Middleburg October 30
 Aldie October 31
 Salem, New Baltimore and near Warrenton November 4
 Rappahannock Station November 7–9
 Battle of Fredericksburg December 12–15
 In camp at Falmouth December 15–28 Dumfries December 28

 1863 
 Falmouth January 1 - 19
 "Mud March" January 20 – 24
 Falmouth January 25 - April 13
 Rappahannock Bridge April 14
 Stoneman's Raid April 29 – May 8 Kelly's Ford April 29
 Louisa Court House May 1–2
 South Anna Bridge near Ashland May 3
 Bealton May 10
 Operations on Northern Neck May 20–26 (Detachment)
 Brandy Station and Beverly Ford June 9
 Aldie June 17
 Middleburg June 18–19
 Upperville June 21
 Hanover, Pa., June 30
 Battle of Gettysburg, Pa., July 1–3
 Steven's Furnace July 5
 Hagerstown July 11
 Funkstown, Md., July 12
 Shephardstown and near Harper's Ferry July 14
 Halltown and Charlestown July 15
 Shephardstown July 16
 Little Washington August 5
 Beverly Ford August 15
 Brandy Station September 6
 Advance from the Rappahannock to the Rapidan September 13–17 Culpeper Court House September 13
 Hazel River September 13
 Raccoon Ford September 14
 Culpeper September 20
 White's Ford September 21–22
 Bristoe Campaign October 9–22
 Gaines' Cross Roads October 12
 Warrenton or White Sulphur Springs October 12–13
 Auburn and Bristoe October 14
 St. Stephen's Church October 14
 Blackburn's Ford October 15
 Culpeper October 20
 Near Bealton October 22
 Rappahannock Crossing October 22
 Rappahannock Station October 23
 Advance to line of the Rappahannock November 7–8
 Mine Run Campaign November 26 – December 2 Morton's Ford November 26
 New Hope Church November 27
 Parker's Store November 29
 Expedition to Luray December 21–23

 1864 
 Reconnaissance to Front Royal January 1–4
 Near Salem January 3 (Detachment)
 Kilpatrick's Raid to Richmond February 28 – March 4
 Beaver Dam Station February 29
 Fortifications of Richmond March 1
 Brook's Turnpike March 1
 Old Church March 2
 Near Tunstall Station March 2
 Overland Campaign May 3 – June 15 Battle of Todd's Tavern May 5–6
 Battle of the Wilderness May 6–7
 Todd's Tavern May 7–8
 Sheridan's Raid May 9–24
 Battle of North Anna River May 9–10
 Battle of Ground Squirrel Church and Yellow Tavern May 11
 Diamond Hill May 11
 Brook Church or Fortifications of Richmond May 12
 Battle of Meadow Bridge May 12
 Battle of Jones' Bridge May 17
 Haxall's Landing May 18
 Milford May 20
 Haw's Shop May 28
 Battle of Old Church May 29–30
 Battle of Cold Harbor May 31 – June 1
 About Cold Harbor June 1–7 Sumner's Upper Bridge and McGee's Mills June 2
 Sheridan's Trevillian Raid June 7–24
 Elliott's Mills June 8
 Trevillian Station June 11–12
 Black Creek, Tunstall Station, June 21
 White House, St. Peter's Church, June 21
 St. Mary's Church June 24
 Second Swamp June 28
 Siege operations against Petersburg and Richmond June 1864, to April 1865 Warwick Swamp and Lee's Mill July 12
 Deep Bottom July 27–28
 New Market July 28
 Malvern Hill July 29
 Lee's Mills July 30
 Near Sycamore Church August 9
 Gravel Hill August 14
 Strawberry Plains August 14–18
 Deep Run August 16
 Nelson's Farm August 18
 Ream's Station August 23–25
 Dinwiddie Road near Ream's Station August 23
 Yellow Tavern September 2
 Stony Creek Station September 15
 Belcher's Mills September 17
 Lee's Mills September 18
 Vaughan Road September 26
 Wyatt's Farm September 29
 Poplar Springs Church September 29 – October 1
 Vaughan and Duncan Road October 1
 Boydton Plank Road or Hatcher's Run October 27–28
 Old members mustered out November 4, 1864
 Stony Creek Station December 1
 Bellefield Raid December 7–11
 Bellefield December 9–10

 1865 
 Dabney's Mills, Hatcher's Run, February 5–7
 Appomattox Campaign March 28 – April 9
 Dinwiddle Court House March 30–31
 Five Forks April 1
 Namozine Church and Jettersville April 3
 Fame's Cross Roads and Amelia Springs April 5
 Sailor's Creek and Deatonville Road April 6
 Briery Creek and Farmville April 7
 Appomattox Station April 8
 Appomattox Court House April 9
 Surrender of Lee and his army''
 Duty at Petersburg and in the Dept. of Virginia April 10 – July 24
 Transit to Augusta, Maine July 24–31
 Mustered out August 1, 1865

Casualties

This Regiment lost greatest number killed in action of any Cavalry Regiment in the entire army: 15 Officers and 159 Enlisted men killed and mortally wounded; 3 Officers and 341 Enlisted men died of disease, a total of 518 The regiment also suffered 447 men wounded and 612 (246 having been 1st DC Cavalry prior to their absorption into the 1st Maine) were captured by rebel forces, of which 165 died of disease in prison.

Armament

Troopers in the 1st Maine were initially armed only with a Model 1860 Light Cavalry Saber and two Colt .44 "Army" pistols. Some of the officers and senior NCOs received the Model 1840 Cavalry Saber. They were also issued ten Sharps Carbines per company. They continued with this as standard armament, although a few officers and men privately purchased Burnside, Merrill, Sharps, and Smith carbines. In February 1863, the 1st and the rest of the 1st Brigade of the 3rd Division of the Army of the Potomac's Cavalry Corps were completely armed with carbines (while retaining sabers and their brace of pistols. The 1st drew single-shot Burnside breech-loading carbines that used a metallic cartridge which, as stated above, they found to be an asset when fording waterway. A handful of individuals kept their Sharps if they were modified to accept metal cartridges, or if they were the newer models that used metallic cartridges. On September 10, 1864, all Burnside and Sharps carbines were turned in and the regiment was issued new Spencer carbines. The men from the 1st DC Cavalry had brought enough Henrys with them when they joined to arm four companies in one battalion. From that point to the end of hostilities one battalion was armed with sixteen-shot Henry rifles and two battalions were armed with seven-shot Spencers.

Sabers

Pistols

Carbines

Equipment and Tack
The 1st Maine Cavalry used standard McClellan saddle and tack. Like many other volunteer cavalry regiments, the 1st Maine obtained breast straps for all mounts while some troopers were issued crupper straps and martingales as well.

Uniform
The men of the regiment were issued their initial uniforms as they became avbailable during training in Augusta. They were issued dark blue Cavalry shell jackets, sky blue cavalry trousers (with reinforced seat), and the sky blue Cavalry winter overcoat (with a shorter cape than the infantry version. From photographs in the regimental history, the Hardee hat and slouch hat seemed to be more common than the kepi, or forage cap, among the regiment.

Notable personnel
 Daniel W. Ames, future state legislator
 Jonathan Prince Cilley, ended the war a Brigadier General, was the son of Maine Congressman Jonathan Cilley, great grandson of Major General Joseph Cilley, and nephew of Joseph Cilley
 Ansel Drew, Corporal, Company A, captured battle flag of Hampton's Brigade t Brandy Station
 Llewellyn Garrish Estes, U.S. Medal of Honor winner
 Charles H. Smith, U.S. Medal of Honor winner
 Sidney W. Thaxter, U.S. Medal of Honor winner
 Edward Parsons Tobie, Jr., U.S. Medal of Honor winner

Monuments and memorials
 During the 1880s, planning was undertaken to erect a monument on the Gettysburg National Battlefield which would honor the 1863 service of the 1st Maine Volunteer Cavalry at Gettysburg. That monument was subsequently dedicated in a formal ceremony held at the battlefield on October 3, 1889.

See also
 List of Maine Civil War units
 Maine in the American Civil War
 Cavalry in the American Civil War
 Army of the Potomac
 Army of the Shenandoah

Footnotes

Citations

References

External links
 1st Maine Cavalry Living History Organization
 1st Maine Cavalry Regimental Standard reproduced by Steven Hill.
  History of the 1st Maine Cavalry at Google Books (downloadable for free)
 FamilySearch – 1st Regiment, Maine Cavalry
 The Civil War Archive – Maine 1st Regiment Cavalry
 Maine Memory Network – 1st Maine Cavalry

Units and formations of the Union Army from Maine
1861 establishments in Maine
Military units and formations established in 1861
Military units and formations disestablished in 1865